= Miracle Valley =

- Theatrical release poster
- Directed by: Greg Sestero
- Written by: Greg Sestero
- Produced by: Tom Franco; Iris Torres; Travis Ayers
- Starring: Angela Mariano; Rick Edwards; Greg Sestero; Louisa Torres; Jesse Brenneman; Kristen StephensonPino
- Cinematography: Matthew Halla
- Edited by: Eric L. Beason; Brad McLaughlin
- Music by: Jimmy Lagnefors
- Production companies: Sestero Pictures; Firehouse Productions
- Distributed by: Mubi
- Release dates: October 17, 2021 (Salem Horror Festival); September 16, 2022 (United States)
- Running time: 90 minutes
- Country: United States
- Language: English

Miracle Valley is a 2021 American horror film written, directed, and produced by Greg Sestero.

== Premise ==
An obsessive nature photographer (Sestero) drags his girlfriend (Mariano) to the desert so that he can photograph a rare bird. In the desert the pair are insnared into a blood worshiping cult led by Father Jake (Edwards).

== Cast ==
- Angela Mariano as Sarah Bloom
- Rick Edwards as Father Jake
- Greg Sestero as David
- Louisa Torres as Erika Torres
- Jesse Brenneman as Scott
- Kristen StephensonPino as Jane

== Production ==
Sestero wrote the screenplay while living in Arizona, where the film was also shot and set, and was inspired by locations in the state including an abandoned church in Cochise County and an abandoned mine house in Patagonia, Arizona. Sestero wanted to write an homage to Slasher cinema and 1970s horror cinema, and also cited The Thing, Don't Breathe, Breakdown, and the works of Alfred Hitchcock including Psycho.

Sestero scouted locations himself for the film, and collaborated with Matthew Halla as director of photography, whom he had met through USC School of Cinematic Arts.

The film was produced by Tom Franco, who also produced The Disaster Artist, the film adaptation of Greg Sestero's book of the same name, and his wife Iris Torres. Torres also worked on the film as assistant director.

== Release ==
The film premiered at the Salem Horror Festival on October 17, 2021. It was released on streaming service Tubi on September 16, 2022.

== Reception ==
Both Sestero and critics compared the film to The Room, a cult film Sestero starred in, which has been called "the best worst movie ever made." Referencing the film, Sestero said, "Hopefully, Miracle Valley ends up as the second best worst movie ever made." while, writing for Sight and Sound, critic Anton Bitel wrote, "Perhaps Sestero’s debut as writer/director seeks to replicate The Room's peculiar effect, leaving the viewer unsure whether its tone-deaf awfulness is a product of unhinged sincerity or knowing irony."
