= Katharine Johnson =

Katharine, Catherine or Kate Johnson (or similar) may refer to:

== People ==
=== Arts ===
- Katharine McMahon Johnson (1855–1924), American literary figure and wife of Robert Underwood Johnson
- Katie Johnson (English actress) (1878–1957)
- Kate Edelman Johnson American film and television producer and philanthropist
- Kathie Lee Johnson (born 1953), American singer and television personality
- Catherine Johnson (playwright) (born 1957), English playwright
- Catherine Johnson (novelist) (born 1962), English author
- Kate Johnson (artist) (1969–2020), American artist
- Katy Johnson (born 1978), American beauty pageant winner, Miss Vermont 1999
- Kate Johnson (writer) (born 1982), English author
- Kate Lang Johnson (born 1984), American actress and model
- Katie Johnson (American actress) (born 1986), American model and actress
- Kay Johnson (1904–1975), American actress

=== Sports ===
- Kathy Johnson (born 1959), American artistic gymnast
- Kathryn Johnson (field hockey, born 1963), Canadian field hockey player
- Kathryn Johnson (field hockey, born 1967), English field hockey player
- Kate Johnson (rower) (born 1978), American rower
- Kathryn Johnson (rugby union) (born 1991), American rugby player

=== Others ===
- Catherine Johnson (scientist), planetary scientist
- Katharine Johnson Jackson (1841–1921), née Johnson, American physician
- Kathryn Magnolia Johnson (1878–1954), educator and political activist
- Kathryn Johnson (journalist) (1926–2019), American journalist
- Katherine Johnson (1918–2020), American physicist, space scientist, and mathematician
- Katie Johnson (secretary) (born 1981), American assistant to President Obama
- Kathryn Johnson, American engineer, co-founder of Young Engineers / Future Leaders
- Kate Johnson (businesswoman), business executive

== Characters ==
- Katherine Johnson, a character in Jack Higgins' novel Day of Reckoning

== Other uses ==
- S. S. Katherine Johnson, an NG-OA Cygnus cargo space capsule used on ISS mission Cygnus NG-15
- GPS Block III SV-08 "Katherine Johnson", a U.S. NavStar GPS GNSS satellite named after NASA scientist Katherine Johnson
- ÑuSat Aleph 1-15 "Katherine Johnson" (COSPAR 2020-079G), an Argentine Earth observation satellite named after NASA scientist Katherine Johnson
- USS Catherine Johnson, American ship built in 1913; scrapped in 1932

== See also ==
- Katie Johnson (disambiguation)
- Kathy Johnson (disambiguation)
- Kay Johnson (disambiguation)
- Katarina Johnson-Thompson (born 1993), English track and field athlete
- Katrina McClain Johnson (born 1965), American basketball player
- Louisa Catherine Johnson (1775–1852), American First Lady and wife of John Quincy Adams
- Kathrine Johnsen (1917–2002), Norwegian broadcaster considered the mother of Sámi radio
- Kathryn Johnston (disambiguation)
- Cat Johnson, romance author
- Kathleen R. Johnson, American geologist and paleoclimatologist
