= Tom Bissell =

American journalist and writer (born 1974)

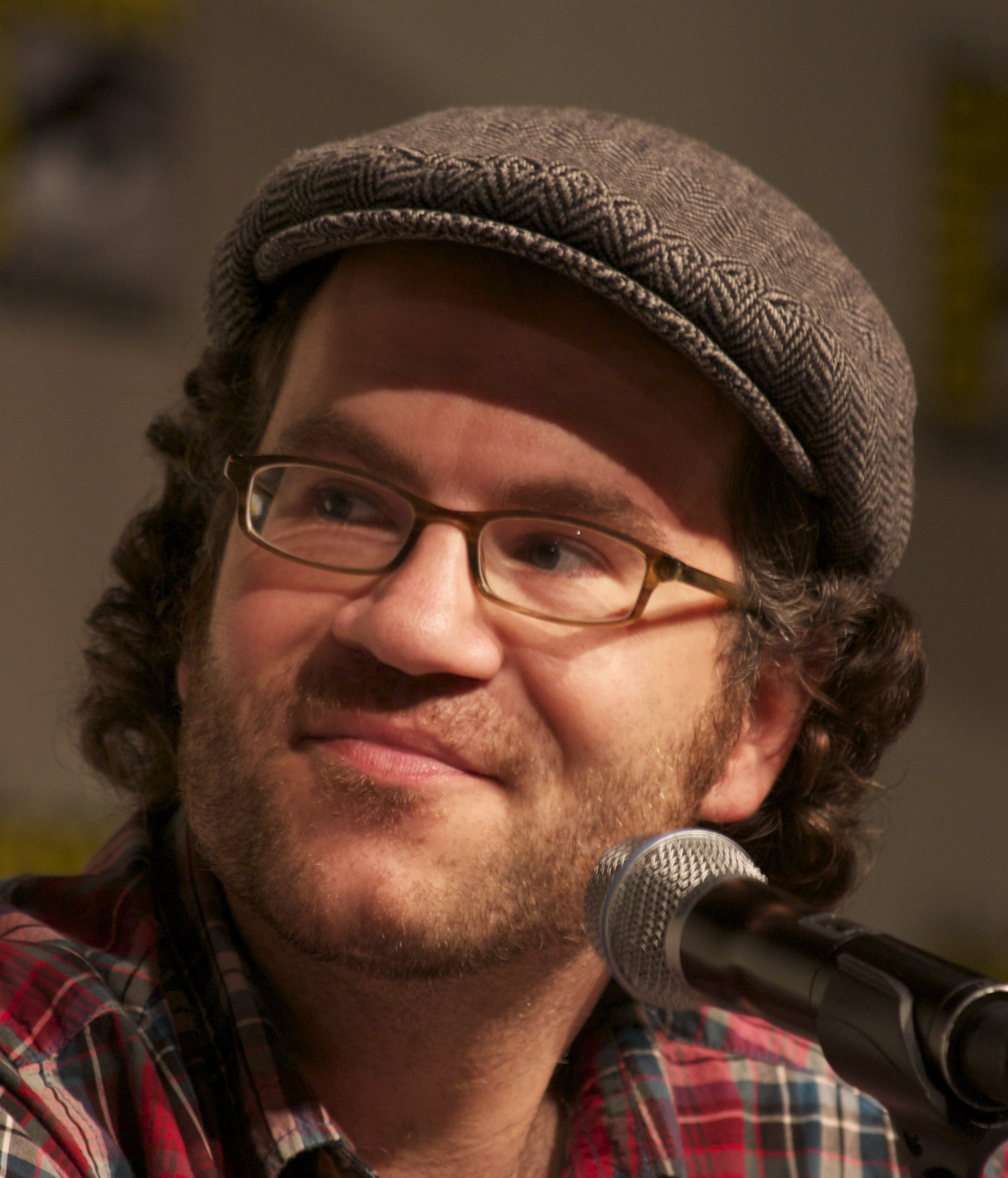
- Bissell at the 2012 Comic-Con International
- Born: January 9, 1974 (age 52); Escanaba, Michigan, U.S.
- Occupations: Journalist, author, screenwriter
- Writing career
- Genres: Journalism, fiction, criticism, video games
- Notable works: The Disaster Artist; The Mosquito Coast; Extra Lives: Why Video Games Matter

Tom Bissell (born January 9, 1974) is an American journalist, critic, and writer, best known for his extensive work as a writer of video games, including The Vanishing of Ethan Carter, Battlefield Hardline, and Gears 5. His work has been adapted into films by Julia Loktev, Werner Herzog and James Franco.

== Personal life ==
Bissell studied English at Michigan State University in East Lansing, Michigan. In 1996, when he was 22 years old, Bissell went to Uzbekistan as a volunteer for the Peace Corps. He was there for seven months before returning home. He worked as a book editor in New York City and edited, among other books, The Collected Stories of Richard Yates and Paula Fox's memoir Borrowed Finery. He is a frequent reviewer for The New York Times Book Review.

Bissell's father served in the Marines during the Vietnam War, alongside author and journalist Philip Caputo. The two remained friends during Bissell's childhood and Caputo read Bissell's work and encouraged him in his early writing efforts.

== Career ==
Bissell has written for Harper's Magazine, Slate, The New Republic, and The Virginia Quarterly Review, where he is a contributing editor. While much of Bissell's magazine writing could be considered travel writing, his articles are more concerned with politics, history, and autobiography than tourism.

As a journalist he traveled to Iraq and Afghanistan during wartime.

Bissell's literary work has been recognized and highlighted at Michigan State University in their Michigan Writers Series.

His book in collaboration with Jeff Alexander, "Speak, Commentary", is a collection of fake DVD commentaries for popular films by political figures and pundits such as Noam Chomsky, Dinesh D'Souza and Ann Coulter.

His other books have earned him several prizes, including the Rome Prize, the Anna Akhmatova Prize, and the Best Travel Writing Award from Peace Corps Writers. His journalism has been anthologized in The Best American Travel Writing, and The Best American Science Writing.

In 2005, Pantheon published a collection of Bissell's short fiction, God Lives in St. Petersburg: and Other Stories. In the same year, his story "Death Defier" was published in the Best American Short Stories. His story "Aral" inspired Werner Herzog's 2016 film Salt and Fire.

In Extra Lives: Why Video Games Matter (2010), Bissell explored the subject of the video game industry. Part memoir, part genre criticism, the book features a profile of Gears of War series game designer Cliff Bleszinski, who had achieved celebrity-like status for the hit video game Gears of War, and a chapter on the appeal of games like Grand Theft Auto IV, including Bissell's own simultaneous struggles with addiction to video games and cocaine. Many of the book's essays were written on assignment by established publications such as The Observer and The New Yorker, and argued the importance of videogames as a cultural and social movement. That year, Bissell was recognized as one of the video game industry's most influential voices opening the door to more opportunities in video games. Bissell went on to write for many hit game franchises, and in 2019, would become the lead writer and an executive producer for an anthology television series based on the non-fiction book Masters of Doom based on the industry's early days.

Bissell wrote about the cult film The Room in a 2010 article ("Cinema Crudité") published in Harper's Magazine. In May 2011, he signed on to co-write (with actor Greg Sestero) a closer look at the film – the resultant book, The Disaster Artist, was published by Simon and Schuster in October 2013. It was later adapted into the feature film The Disaster Artist directed by James Franco and released in 2017. The script adaption of the book was nominated for an Academy Award for Best Adapted Screenplay in 2017.

Bissell's story "Expensive Trips Nowhere" was filmed as The Loneliest Planet (2011). In 2021, he co-developed the television series The Mosquito Coast based on the novel of the same name. In 2025, he was credited with writing the final three episodes of the Star Wars series Andor, having joined the writing staff in 2022 for the second season.

=== Approach and influences ===
While Bissell has been critical of neo-conservatism, the Bush administration, and American unilateralism, his politics often do not fit within established categories of American liberalism and conservatism. Much of his work is concerned with the legacy of the Soviet Union and Communism. He has cited Philip Caputo as a major influence, along with Michigan writers Jim Harrison and Thomas McGuane. In 2020, he called Martin Amis his favorite then-living writer, and he has praised Inside Story as Amis' most beautiful book.

== Awards ==
- 2010 Guggenheim Fellow
- Rome Prize
- Writers Guild of America Award

== Bibliography ==
- Chasing the Sea: Lost Among the Ghosts of Empire in Central Asia (2003) ISBN 978-0-375-42130-3
- Speak, Commentary: The Big Little Book of Fake Dvd Commentaries (2003) (with Jeff Alexander) ISBN 978-1-932416-07-7
- God Lives in St. Petersburg: and Other Stories (2005) ISBN 978-0-375-42264-5
- The Father of All Things: A Marine, His Son, and the Legacy of Vietnam (2007) ISBN 978-0-375-42265-2
- "The grammar of fun : CliffyB and the world of the video game". Annals of Technology. The New Yorker. 84 (35): 78–84. November 3, 2008.
- Extra Lives: Why Video Games Matter (2010), ISBN 978-0-307-37870-5
- Magic Hours: Essays On Creators and Creation (2012), ISBN 978-1-936365-76-0
- The Disaster Artist: My Life Inside The Room, The Greatest Bad Movie Ever Made (2013, with Greg Sestero), ISBN 1451661193
- Apostle : or bones that shine like fire : travels among the tombs of the twelve. New York: Pantheon Books. 2016. (Note: Briefly reviewed in the April 25, 2016 issue of The New Yorker, p.95.)
- Creative Types: And Other Stories (2021) ISBN 978-1524749156

== Video game scripts ==
- Apocalypse Now (unreleased video game based upon the film Apocalypse Now, co-written with Rob Auten)
- Yar's Revenge (2011, with Rob Auten, uncredited)
- Gears of War: Judgment (2013, with Rob Auten)
- Batman: Arkham Origins (2013, additional writing)
- The Vanishing of Ethan Carter (2014, with Rob Auten)
- Battlefield Hardline (2015, with Rob Auten)
- Tales from the Borderlands: Episode 3 (2015, additional writing)
- The Writer Will Do Something (2015, with Matthew S. Burns)
- Uncharted 4: A Thief's End (2016, additional writing)
- The Witness (2016, early story consultant)
- Gears of War 4 (2016, lead writer)
- What Remains of Edith Finch (2017, additional writing)
- Uncharted: The Lost Legacy (2017, additional writing)
- Gears 5 (2019, lead writer)
