= The Disaster Artist =

2013 non-fiction book

- Front cover of the first edition
- Author: Greg Sestero; Tom Bissell
- Audio read by: Greg Sestero
- Language: English
- Genre: Non-fiction, memoirs
- Publisher: Simon & Schuster
- Publication date: October 10, 2013
- Publication place: United States
- Media type: Print (hardcover and paperback), e-book, audiobook
- Pages: 268 pp
- ISBN: 1451661193 (hardback edition)
- OCLC: 830352130
- LC Class: 2013008798
- Website: www.thedisasterartistbook.com

The Disaster Artist: My Life Inside The Room, the Greatest Bad Movie Ever Made is a 2013 non-fiction book written by Greg Sestero and Tom Bissell, in which the former details the troubled development and production of the panned 2003 cult romantic drama The Room, his own struggles as a young actor, and his relationship with The Room director Tommy Wiseau.

A film adaptation of the same name was released in 2017, directed by and starring James Franco as Wiseau and his brother Dave Franco as Sestero.

== Synopsis ==
In 1997, Greg Sestero, an aspiring actor struggling with confidence, first encounters Tommy Wiseau in an acting class held by Jean Shelton in San Francisco. Sestero is initially perplexed by Wiseau's over-the-top acting technique, unusual physical appearance, untraceable accent, and eccentric behavior, which includes a fascination bordering on obsession with American culture and a refusal to discuss his past. At the same time, Sestero admires Wiseau's boldness and genuine enthusiasm for both life and acting. The two form an odd but affectionate bond as Sestero learns of the many contradictions of Wiseau's personality.

Sestero signs with talent agent Iris Burton; as he slowly accrues more acting credits and makes other friends, Wiseau grows jealous and schemes to earn similar acknowledgment (such as earning a SAG card by producing and starring in a commercial for a company he himself owned), and threatens to evict Sestero from the Los Angeles apartment he is loaning to him, leading Sestero to become uncomfortable with their relationship. After viewing The Talented Mr. Ripley for the first time, Sestero is struck by how similar Wiseau is to the title character. However, when Wiseau also sees the film, instead of recognizing his own behavior, he is deeply impressed by it and becomes obsessed with creating something just as emotionally powerful. He subsequently disappears from Sestero's life for nine months—during which their occasional phone calls frequently indicate that Wiseau had become depressed and suicidal. He eventually returns to Los Angeles with a finished script for his film: The Room, which includes a character, Mark, named after Ripley actor Matt Damon (whose name Wiseau had misremembered).

Backed by a mysterious, seemingly endless supply of money, Wiseau develops, produces, directs, and stars as the lead role in The Room, despite having no knowledge of filmmaking whatsoever. On-set relationships are a disaster: the story itself is nonsensical and full of plot threads that are never addressed or resolved (a matter complicated by Wiseau refusing to give anyone a full copy of the script); Wiseau's camera set-up requires two crews to operate, actors and crew storm off the set, dialogue and blocking are constantly tweaked, sets are dismantled only to be rebuilt and re-shot the following day, and, at the last possible moment, Wiseau convinces Sestero to play Mark despite the role already having been cast. By the end of the shooting, Sestero, along with the rest of the cast and crew, become convinced that the film is merely a vanity project for Wiseau that will never actually be seen by anyone and lose their enthusiasm, resulting in lackluster performances and technical and storytelling blunders that prove impossible to correct in post-production. The production also takes its toll on Sestero's relationship with his girlfriend, who breaks up with him after the Los Angeles portion of the shoot ends. To lift Sestero's morale, Wiseau writes additional scenes for them to perform during second unit filming in San Francisco, which runs considerably smoother, to everyone's surprise. These recollections are occasionally interspersed with "fantastical, sad, self-contradictory stories" about Wiseau's conflicted past, which apparently includes such experiences as being ridiculed for his interest in America while growing up in an unidentified Eastern Bloc country, being threatened with death by sadistic French policemen, and quietly progressing from a yo-yo and toy bird salesman to a retail and real estate tycoon, which serve to highlight his motivations for attempting to enter the film industry.

Shortly after filming ends, Wiseau gives Sestero a rough cut of the film as a parting gift. Sestero screens it for his family, who are enthralled by its bizarre ineptitude. Their reaction turns out to be prophetic when, eight months later, Wiseau secures a release for the film, beginning its cult reputation as "the Citizen Kane of bad movies." The book ends with Sestero's meditation on how Wiseau's handling of The Room's creation demonstrates the power (and danger) of unshakeable belief in one's dreams.

== Film adaptation ==
A film adaptation of the same name, directed, co-produced by and starring James Franco as Wiseau and Dave Franco as Sestero, premiered at South by Southwest on March 12, 2017, and was released in the United States on December 1, 2017. It won Best Actor – Motion Picture Musical or Comedy for James Franco at the Golden Globe Awards and received an Academy Award nomination for Best Adapted Screenplay.

== Audiobook ==
In May 2014, an audiobook version of The Disaster Artist was released by Tantor Audio, with Sestero reading the story. Sestero's impression of Wiseau in the audiobook has received praise from critics, including The Huffington Post and Publishers Weekly.

The Disaster Artist audiobook was named a finalist for the 2015 Audie Awards for Best Humor Audiobook.

== Awards ==
In March 2014, The Disaster Artist (Audiobook) won for Favorite Non-Fiction Book of 2013 at Bookish.

On November 23, 2014, The Disaster Artist won for Best Non-Fiction at the National Arts & Entertainment Journalism Awards ceremony in Los Angeles. The judges praised the book, stating "The Disaster Artist is not only a hell of a good read, it will make a great film if ever adapted. It's equal parts Ed Wood, American Hustle and demented Citizen Kane—with a dash of Monty Python thrown into the mix".

On February 11, 2015, The Disaster Artist (Audiobook) was nominated for Best Humor Audiobook at the Audie Awards, and was narrated by author Greg Sestero. The awards ceremony was held May 28, 2015 in New York City.
