= Katie Johnson =

Katie Johnson may refer to:

- Katie Johnson (footballer) (born 1994), American-born Mexican footballer
- Katie Johnson (English actress) (1878–1957), English actress
- Katie Johnson (American actress), or Katie J. Stone (born 1986), American fine art model, dancer, and actress
- Katie Johnson (secretary) (born 1981), secretary to US President Barack Obama
- Katy Johnson, American beauty pageant winner; Miss Vermont 1999 and Miss Vermont USA 2001
- "Katie Johnson", the pseudonym of a woman who accused Donald Trump of sexual assault, see Donald Trump sexual misconduct allegations § Katie Johnson/Jane Doe (1994)

== See also ==
- Kedie Johnson (born 2000), Trinidadian footballer
- Katie Higgins Cook (née Johnson, 21st century), American aviator and officer
- Katharine Johnson (disambiguation)
