= Infrared (disambiguation) =

Infrared is electromagnetic radiation with longer wavelengths than those of visible light, extending from the nominal red edge of the visible spectrum.

Infrared may also refer to:

== Music ==
=== Songs ===
- "Infra-Red" (Placebo song), 2006
- "Infra-Red" (Three Days Grace song), 2018
- "Infrared", a song by Pusha T from the album Daytona
- "Infra Red", a song by Psapp from the EP Do Something Wrong

=== People ===
- Infared, featured artist on the 2016 song "All the Way Up"

== Other uses ==
- Infrared (film), a 2022 found footage horror film
- Consumer infrared, as used in wireless remote controls, keyboards, and other devices
- Infrared, livestreaming platform of American activist and political commentator Haz Al-Din

== See also ==
- Infrared spectroscopy, a subset of spectroscopy
- Infrared homing device, a type of infrared device
- Infrared Data Association (IrDA)
