= The Barber (2014 film) =

- Film poster
- Directed by: Basel Owies
- Written by: Max Enscoe
- Produced by: Travis Knox
- Starring: Scott Glenn; Chris Coy; Kristen Hager; Stephen Tobolowsky; Max Arciniega; Olivia Taylor Dudley; Lydia Hearst; Tim Dezam; Valorie Hubbard; Thomas Calabro
- Cinematography: Allen Liu
- Edited by: Nader Owies; Greg Thompson
- Music by: Freddy Sheinfeld
- Production company: Chapman Filmed Entertainment
- Distributed by: Arc Entertainment
- Release dates: October 3, 2014 (Busan); March 27, 2015 (United States)
- Running time: 90 minutes 95 minutes
- Country: United States
- Language: English

The Barber is a 2014 American thriller film directed by Basel Owies and starring Scott Glenn. It is Owies's feature directorial debut.

== Cast ==
- Scott Glenn as Eugene Van Wingerdt / Francis Allen Visser
- Chris Coy as John McCormack
- Kristen Hager as Audrey Bennett
- Stephen Tobolowsky as Chief Gary Hardaway
- Max Arciniega as Luis Ramirez
- Olivia Taylor Dudley as Kelli
- Lydia Hearst as Melissa
- Tim Dezam as Capt. Phil Baroni
- Valorie Hubbard as Grace
- Thomas Calabro as Thomas McCormack

== Release ==
The film premiered at the Busan International Film Festival on October 3, 2014. It was then released in limited theaters and on VOD on March 27, 2015.

== Reception ==
The film has a 20% rating on Rotten Tomatoes. Oktay Ege Kozak of IndieWire graded the film a D. Tirdad Derakhshani of The Philadelphia Inquirer awarded the film two and a half stars out of four.

Dennis Harvey of Variety gave the film a negative review and wrote "An apparent serial-killer-wannabe tracks down his would-be mentor in this underwhelming thriller."
