= Tom Franco =

American actor (born 1980)

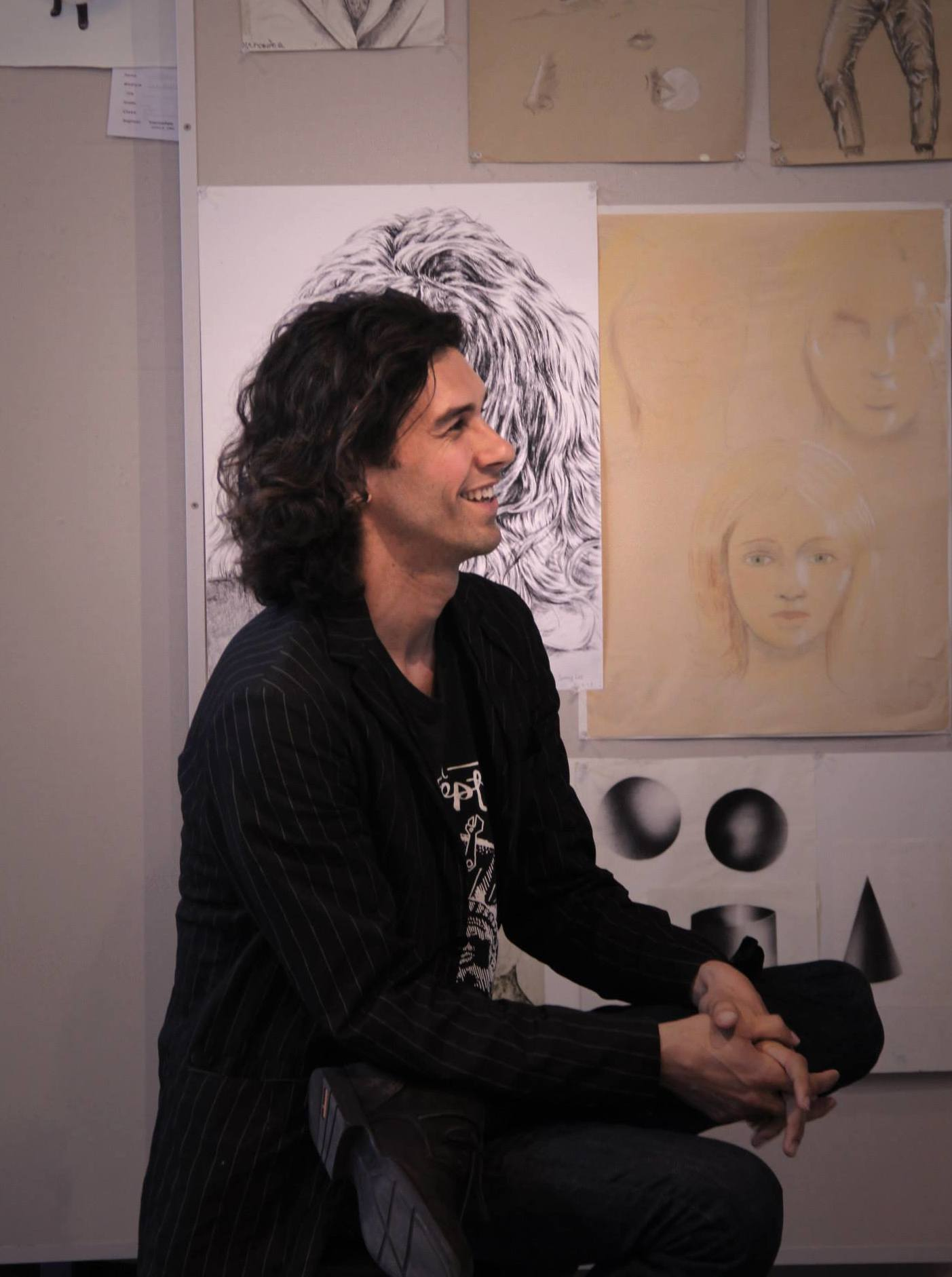
- Franco in 2016
- Born: Thomas Andrew Franco; April 14, 1980 (age 46); Palo Alto, California, U.S.
- Education: University of California, Santa Cruz (BFA); California College of the Arts
- Occupations: Artist, actor
- Years active: 1990–present
- Spouses: Julia Lazar (m. 2014; died 2014) Iris Torres (m. 2021)
- Children: 1
- Relatives: James Franco (brother); Dave Franco (brother)

Thomas Andrew Franco (born April 14, 1980) is an American actor, artist, and the founder of the Firehouse Art Collective in Berkeley, California. He is the brother of actors James Franco and Dave Franco.

== Early life and education ==
Franco was born Thomas Andrew Franco on April 14, 1980, in Palo Alto, California. His mother, Betsy Lou (née Verne; born 1947), is a writer and occasional actor. His father, Douglas Eugene Franco (1948–2011), ran a Silicon Valley business, and was a "philanthropic entrepreneur". Franco's father was of Portuguese (Madeiran) and Swedish descent. Franco's mother is from a family of Russian Jewish ancestry; her parents had changed the surname from "Verovitz" to "Verne." Tom was born the second of their three children, all boys; the older is actor, director, writer, and artist James Franco and the younger is actor and director Dave Franco. They were raised in Palo Alto.

Franco is a graduate of Palo Alto High School, class of 1998. He graduated in 2002 from University of California, Santa Cruz majoring in fine art, then attended California College of the Arts in Oakland, California, majoring in ceramics.

== Career ==
Franco started acting professionally with his role as Frog Boy in the comedy horror film Basket Case 2 (1990). He subsequently appeared in A Peace of History (2005) and The Devil Wears a Toupee (2007). He had a small role in The Disaster Artist (2017), as a crew member on The Room, in which his brothers played the lead roles (James as Tommy Wiseau and Dave as Greg Sestero).

Franco is the founder and co-director of Berkeley's Firehouse Art Collective. He shared directorship with his wife Julia Lazar Franco, who died in 2014.

== Personal life ==
Franco's first wife, Julia Lazar, worked closely with him. They married in a private ceremony on July 28, 2014 and she died one month later. Her death was a result of liver failure (brought on by hepatitis C and liver cancer) and kidney trouble. The two were married in a hospital solarium about a month before her death.

On May 14, 2021, Franco married film producer Iris Torres. On February 25, 2023, Franco and Torres revealed they were expecting their first child. Their son, Lennon Jnaneshwar Franco, was born on May 4, 2023.
