= Kelsey Gunn =

American actress

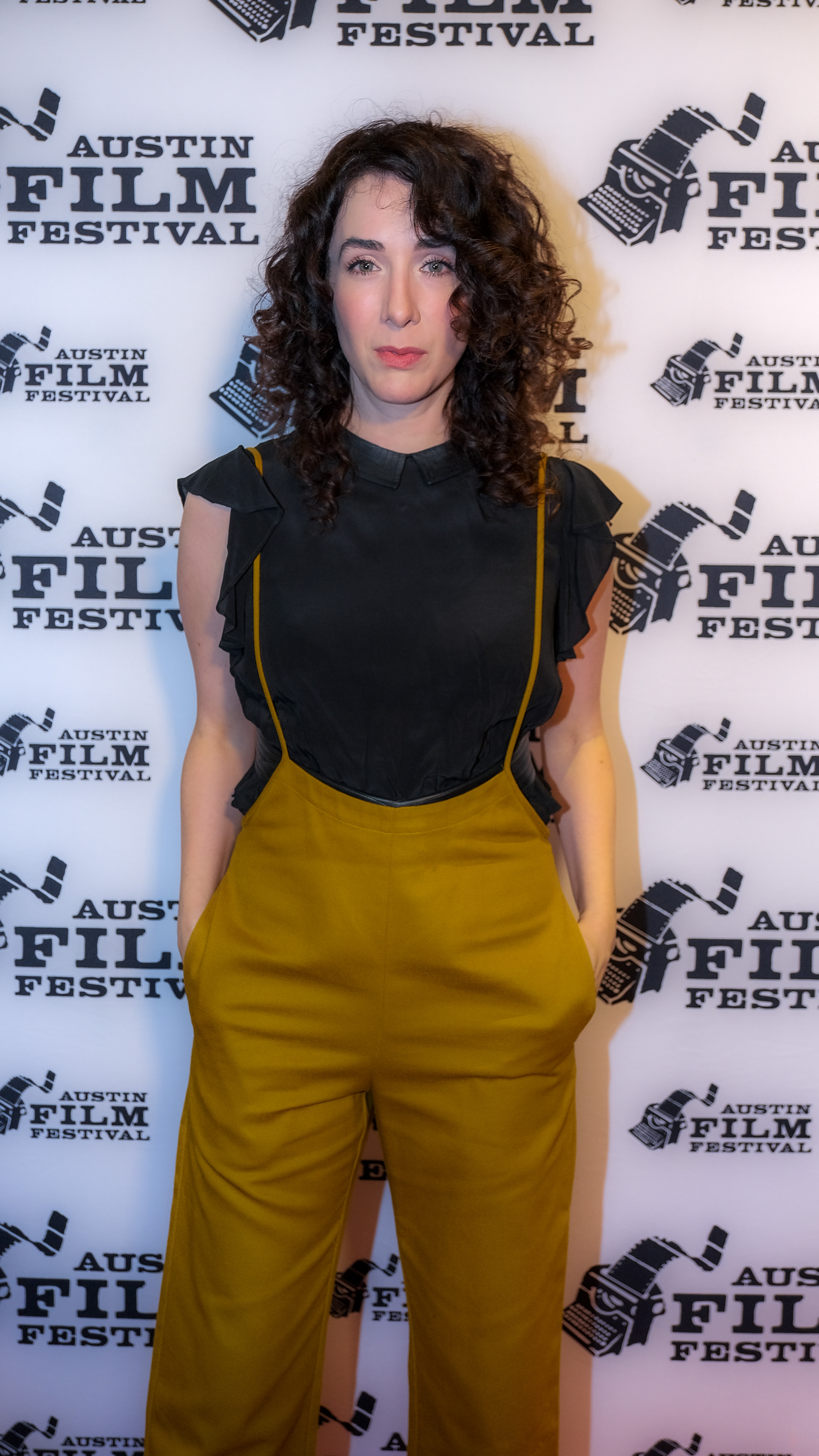
- Kelsey Gunn at the Austin Film Festival
- Born: Kelsey Anna Solen Gunn; Arlington, Washington, U.S.
- Occupation(s): Actor, Writer, and Comedian
- Website: www.kelseygunn.com

Kelsey Gunn is an American actress. She is known for her film roles such as Little Jar (2022), Bigfoot Famous (2021), and Dude Bro Party Massacre 3 (2015), in addition for her television roles such as the NBC comedy series Community, and for her work in the internet sketch group 5-Second Films.

== Career ==
Gunn had her first major film role in the 2015 American satirical slasher film Dude Bro Party Massacre 3, created by the comedy troupe 5-Second Films. She co-wrote her first feature film Little Jar with creative partner and fiancé Dominic López. She also starred in the magical realism comedy which had its World Premiere at the Austin Film Festival in 2022. Little Jar won the Grand Jury Prize for Best Narrative Feature at the 2022 Paris International Film Festival in addition to winning the Best Actress Award for her portrayal of misanthrope Ainsley, receiving positive praise from reviewers from Film Threat reviewer Bradley Gibson and French film reviewer Latoya Austin. Gunn's other notable roles include Bigfoot Famous, Nerdist Presents: The Mystic Museum, Influenced, and Assisting Navarro.

Gunn's television roles include appearances on Community, How to Be a Gentleman and Castle.

== Filmography ==
Film roles
Year	Title	Role	Notes
2011	The Death and Return of Superman	Young Max Landis	
2015	Dude Bro Party Massacre 3	Samantha	
2018	Save Yourself	Amy	
2020	Assisting Navarro	Kelsey	written by Kelsey Gunn
2020	Influenced	Brittany	
2021	Bigfoot Famous	Martha Meltzer	
2022	Little Jar	Ainsley	co-written by Kelsey Gunn

Television roles
Year	Title	Role	Notes
2008	Casanovas	Kristen	Episode: "The Sex Tape"
2009	Operating Instructions	Nurse	Episode: Pilot
2009-2010	Community	Student	Episodes: "Environmental Science", "Contemporary American Poultry", "Anthropology 101"
2010	Castle	Sarah Lieberman	Episode: "Almost Famous"
2012	Meter Maids	Kelsey	Episode: "Bad"
2012	How to Be a Gentleman	Claudette	Episode: "How to be Draft Andrew"
2012-2013	SMBC Theatre	Various	Episodes: "Crazy Brain", "Batman Academy", "Office Survival"
2013	Date-A-Max	Tammi	Episode: "Tammi"
2013-2014	Uproxx Video	Various	Web series; 33 episodes
2014	The Front Page	Jane Presley	Episode: Pilot
2014-2017	The Cyanide & Happiness Show	Various	Recurring Role: 7 Episodes
2015	Rocket Jump: The Show	Woman with Broken Leg	Episode: "Truck Puncher v Bus Flipper"
2017	AOK	Other Woman	Episode: "Furry Shades Darker"
2017	Nerdist Presents: The Mystic Museum	Kelsey	Episode: Pilot
2018	The Blubburbs	Marina	Main Role
2020	Quinn's Place	Chelsea	Episode: "Stars & Squirts"
2020-2023	Grey Rabbit	Various	Recurring Role: 7 Episodes
2009-2023	5 Second Films	Various	Main Role
