= The Disaster Artist (film) =

2017 film by James Franco

- Theatrical release poster
- Directed by: James Franco
- Screenplay by: Scott Neustadter; Michael H. Weber
- Based on: The Disaster Artist: My Life Inside The Room, the Greatest Bad Movie Ever Made by Greg Sestero & Tom Bissell
- Produced by: James Franco; Vince Jolivette; Seth Rogen; Evan Goldberg; James Weaver
- Starring: James Franco; Dave Franco; Seth Rogen; Alison Brie; Ari Graynor; Josh Hutcherson; Jacki Weaver
- Cinematography: Brandon Trost
- Edited by: Stacey Schroeder
- Music by: Dave Porter
- Production companies: New Line Cinema; Good Universe; Point Grey Pictures
- Distributed by: A24 (United States and Canada); Warner Bros. Pictures (international)
- Release dates: March 12, 2017 (SXSW); December 1, 2017 (United States)
- Running time: 103 minutes
- Country: United States
- Language: English
- Budget: $10 million
- Box office: $29.8 million

The Disaster Artist is a 2017 American biographical comedy-drama film starring, co-produced and directed by James Franco. It was written by Scott Neustadter and Michael H. Weber, based on Greg Sestero and Tom Bissell's 2013 non-fiction book. The Disaster Artist stars brothers James and Dave Franco as Wiseau and Sestero, respectively, alongside a supporting cast featuring Alison Brie, Ari Graynor, Josh Hutcherson, Jacki Weaver, and Seth Rogen.

The film chronicles an unlikely friendship between aspiring actors Tommy Wiseau and Sestero that results in the production of Wiseau's 2003 film The Room, widely considered one of the worst films ever made.

Principal photography began on December 8, 2015. A work-in-progress cut of the film premiered at South by Southwest on March 12, 2017; it was later screened at the 2017 Toronto International Film Festival on September 11, and also played at the 2017 San Sebastián International Film Festival, where it became the first American film to win its top prize, the Golden Shell, since A Thousand Years of Good Prayers in 2007.

Distributed by A24 in North America and Warner Bros. Pictures internationally, The Disaster Artist began a limited release on December 1, 2017, before opening wide on December 8, 2017. It received positive reviews from critics, who praised the chemistry between the Franco brothers and their portrayals of Wiseau and Sestero, as well as the film's humor and screenplay. The Disaster Artist was chosen by the National Board of Review as one of the top ten films of 2017. At the 75th Golden Globe Awards, James Franco won the award for Best Actor – Musical or Comedy; the film was also nominated for Best Motion Picture – Musical or Comedy. Franco also received a nomination for Outstanding Performance by a Male Actor in a Leading Role at the 24th Screen Actors Guild Awards, and the film earned a nomination for Best Adapted Screenplay at the 90th Academy Awards.

== Plot ==
In San Francisco in 1998, 19-year-old Greg Sestero befriends Tommy Wiseau in Jean Shelton's acting class after Tommy gives a bizarre interpretation of a scene from A Streetcar Named Desire. Greg is impressed by Tommy's fearlessness, though Tommy also exhibits unusual habits and mannerisms; for instance, he can afford apartments in both San Francisco and Los Angeles, but refuses to discuss his personal life or the source of his wealth, and insists that he is from New Orleans despite his pronounced European accent. At Tommy's suggestion, the two move to Los Angeles to pursue acting careers.

Greg signs with talent agent Iris Burton, regularly attends auditions, and starts dating a girl named Amber. Meanwhile, Tommy is constantly rejected by agencies, acting teachers, casting directors, and producers, and believes Amber is sabotaging his and Greg's friendship. As Greg's auditions begin to dry up, Tommy decides to make a film for them to star in.

Tommy writes the screenplay for The Room, a melodrama about a love triangle between banker Johnny (played by Tommy), his fiancée Lisa, and his best friend Mark (played by Greg, who is also given a line producer credit). Tommy insists on buying, rather than renting, all of the production equipment they need, and decides to shoot the film on 35 mm film and HD Digital simultaneously, another costly and unnecessary measure. He hires Raphael Smadja as the cinematographer and Sandy Schklair as the director and script supervisor, and casts actress Juliette Danielle as Lisa.

While production starts smoothly, Tommy's controlling behavior and lack of experience soon begin to cause problems. He forgets his lines, arrives late, and refuses to supply his crew with basic needs like drinking water and air conditioning, even when one of the actors suffers a heat stroke on set. The cast and crew are baffled by the film's nonsensical plot and Tommy's inexplicable directorial and acting choices.

Tensions mount between the crew and Tommy when he refuses to film on a closed set and insults Juliette during a sex scene, during which he almost gets into a fight with Smadja. Tommy then angrily reveals that he has been watching the behind-the-scenes footage of the production and thus knows what the cast and crew have been saying about him behind his back. Also, he has already spent $5 million on the production, though he does not disclose where these funds came from.

While The Room is still filming, Greg and Amber run into Bryan Cranston at a café. Cranston reveals that he is directing an upcoming episode of Malcolm in the Middle, the TV show he is on, and invites Greg to play a lumberjack character, noting his lumberjack-like facial hair. Greg begs Tommy to delay shooting of an upcoming scene in The Room where Mark shaves his beard (for no apparent purpose), but Tommy refuses. Greg begrudgingly finishes the film, relinquishing his opportunity to be on the show.

On the last day of shooting, which is on location back in San Francisco, Greg lashes out at Tommy for his selfishness throughout their friendship. He also demands he finally reveal his age, birthplace, and source of income. Tommy refuses and Greg storms off, while a disheartened Tommy declares that filming is wrapped.

By June 2003, Greg has broken up with Amber and started working in theater, and Tommy has finished work on The Room, so he invites Greg to the premiere. He reluctantly agrees; the entire cast and crew also attend. As the film plays on the screen, the capacity audience at first reacts with bemused silence, then increasingly with laughter at Tommy's poor performance, script, and filmmaking techniques.

A humiliated Tommy storms out of the theater, but Greg follows him and asserts that the audience's enthusiastic response is something to be proud of, reconciling their friendship. With renewed optimism, Tommy takes the stage as the film ends and thanks the audience for the warm reception of his "comedic" film. He invites Greg to join him, and the pair receive a standing ovation.

In a post-credits scene, a man named Henry approaches Tommy at a party and invites him to hang out. Tommy declines, but recognizes Henry's familiar "New Orleans" accent.

== Cast ==
- James Franco as Tommy Wiseau, the writer, director, producer, and actor who portrays Johnny in The Room
- Dave Franco as Greg Sestero, the line producer and actor who portrays Mark in The Room
- Seth Rogen as Sandy Schklair, the script supervisor and de facto first assistant director of The Room
- Ari Graynor as Juliette Danielle, the actress who portrays Lisa in The Room
- Alison Brie as Amber, Greg Sestero's girlfriend
- Jacki Weaver as Carolyn Minnott, the actress who portrays Claudette in The Room
- Paul Scheer as Raphael Smadja, the first DP of The Room
- Zac Efron as Dan Janjigian, the actor who portrays Chris-R in The Room
- Josh Hutcherson as Philip Haldiman, the actor who portrays Denny in The Room
- June Diane Raphael as Robyn Paris, the actress who portrays Michelle in The Room
- Megan Mullally as Mrs. Sestero, Greg Sestero's mother
- Jason Mantzoukas as Peter Anway, the representative of Birns & Sawyer
- Andrew Santino as Scott Holmes, the actor who portrays Mike in The Room
- Nathan Fielder as Kyle Vogt, the actor who portrays Peter in The Room
- Sharon Stone as Iris Burton, Greg Sestero's agent
- Melanie Griffith as Jean Shelton, the teacher of an acting class attended by Wiseau and Sestero
- Hannibal Buress as Bill Meurer, the owner of Birns & Sawyer, a film equipment and production space rental firm
- Bob Odenkirk as Wiseau's method acting teacher
- Judd Apatow as a film producer accosted by Wiseau (Note: Apatow's name appears in the title credits, but not in the ending credits.)

Kristen Bell, Ike Barinholtz, Adam Scott, Kevin Smith, Keegan-Michael Key, Lizzy Caplan, Danny McBride and J. J. Abrams appear as themselves in a prologue discussing The Room and its reputation. Other roles include John Early as Burton's executive assistant Chris Snyder, Joe Mande as DP Todd Barron, Lo Mutuc (Note: Credited as Charlyne Yi) as costume designer Safowa Bright-Asare, Kelly Oxford as makeup artist Amy Von Brock, Tom Franco as Karl, Zoey Deutch as Tommy's acting classmate Bobbi, Sugar Lyn Beard as an actress auditioning for Lisa, Brian Huskey as a bank teller, Randall Park as Greg's acting classmate Rob, Jerrod Carmichael as an actor friend of Greg's, Casey Wilson as a casting director, Lauren Ash as the florist in The Room's "Hi, doggie" sequence, and Angelyne as herself. Bryan Cranston makes an uncredited cameo appearance as himself. Greg Sestero appears as an assistant casting director, while Tommy Wiseau appears in a post-credits scene as a character named Henry.

== Production ==
=== Development ===
In February 2014, Seth Rogen's production company Point Grey Pictures announced it had acquired the book and film rights to The Disaster Artist. James Franco was set to direct and play Wiseau, and his brother Dave Franco was cast as Sestero. James Franco stated The Disaster Artist was "a combination of Boogie Nights and The Master". According to Franco, Wiseau initially had hoped Johnny Depp would play him. In April 2016, the title was reported to have changed from The Disaster Artist to The Masterpiece, though The Disaster Artist was confirmed as the official title when the film's SXSW premiere was announced.

=== Casting ===
In June 2014, James Franco's younger brother, Dave Franco, informally announced at a midnight showing of The Room that he had been cast in the co-starring role of Greg Sestero. Critics praised the decision in a Q&A session. The film is the first collaboration of James and brother Dave, as the younger Franco has said that he had sought different projects deliberately, specifying in an interview at the Toronto International Film Festival, "I didn't want people to think I was riding his coattails." As New Line Cinema sought to acquire The Disaster Artist in October 2015, one of the film's producers, and frequent Franco collaborator, Seth Rogen, was in negotiations to play The Room's script supervisor, Sandy Schklair. The remainder of the principal cast were revealed in the days prior to the beginning of filming, in early December 2015: Josh Hutcherson as Philip Haldiman, Ari Graynor as Juliette Danielle, Jacki Weaver as Carolyn Minnott, Hannibal Buress as Bill Meurer, Andrew Santino as Scott Holmes, and Zac Efron as Dan Janjigian. Dave Franco's wife, Alison Brie, joined the cast in the role of Sestero's then-girlfriend, Amber, and Sharon Stone was later announced to have been cast as Hollywood talent agent Iris Burton. Sestero stated in January 2016 that Bryan Cranston had been cast in the film in an undisclosed role. In November 2016, he was revealed to be playing himself during his time working on Malcolm in the Middle.

=== Filming ===
Principal photography began on December 8, 2015, in Los Angeles, and ended on January 28, 2016. Among the locations used was The Ojai Apartments on Whitley Terrace in Hollywood. Dave Porter composed the film's score.

== Release ==
The film had its premiere, in a work-in-progress form, at South by Southwest on March 12, 2017. In May 2017, A24 acquired distribution rights to the film, and set the film for a limited release on December 1, 2017, before a wide release on December 8. Warner Bros. Pictures distributes the film internationally, and it received an IMAX release in selected areas as well. On October 25, 2017, A24 mounted a billboard on Highland Avenue in Los Angeles that replicated the original The Room billboard that Wiseau kept up from 2003 to 2008.

The film was released on Blu-ray, DVD and digital download on March 13, 2018. As of February 20, 2019, its estimated US home media sales were $1,288,213.

== Reception ==
=== Box office ===
The Disaster Artist grossed $21.1 million in the United States and Canada and $8.7 million in other territories for a worldwide total of $29.8 million, against a production budget of $10 million.

The film grossed $1.2 million from 19 theaters in its limited opening weekend, finishing 12th at the box office and averaging $64,254 per venue, one of the highest averages of 2017. The film had its wide expansion the following week, alongside the opening of Just Getting Started and I, Tonya and was projected to gross around $5 million from 840 theaters over the weekend. It ended up making $6.4 million, finishing 4th at the box office. The following week, despite being added to 170 additional theaters, the film dropped a more-than-expected 57% to $2.7 million, finishing 8th. In its third weekend of wide release it made $884,576 ($1.2 million over the four day Christmas frame), dropping to 17th.

=== Critical response ===
The Disaster Artist received a standing ovation at its initial screening at South by Southwest. On the review aggregator website Rotten Tomatoes, The Disaster Artist holds an approval rating of 90% based on 347 professional reviews, with an average rating of 7.8/10. The site's critical consensus reads, "Oh, hai Mark. The Disaster Artist is a surprisingly poignant and charming movie-about-a-movie that explores the creative process with unexpected delicacy." Metacritic, which uses a weighted average, assigned The Disaster Artist a score of 76 out of 100 based on 44 critics, indicating "generally favorable reviews". Audiences polled by PostTrak gave the film an 81% overall positive score and a 66% "definite recommend".

Erik Childress of The Playlist dubbed James Franco's performance his "best... since his Oscar-nominated turn in 127 Hours." Further, he wrote that "as a director it is nice to finally see him embrace the comfort zone of comedy with enough cameos to rival Robert Altman's The Player." Peter Debruge of Variety said it had a "genuine capacity to delight, whether or not the audiences in question have seen The Room."

Writing for Rolling Stone, Peter Travers gave the film 3.5 out of 4 stars, saying: "As a director, Franco succeeds beautifully at bringing coherence to chaos, a word that accurately describes the making of this modern midnight-movie phenomenon. Do you need to see The Room to appreciate The Disaster Artist? Not really." Justin Chang of the Los Angeles Times called the film "a hilarious, heartening celebration of failure".

Manohla Dargis of The New York Times wrote that it is "a divertingly funny movie, but its breeziness can also feel overstated, at times glib and a bit of a dodge". Peter Bradshaw of The Guardian gave the film three out of five stars, writing that it brings up unanswered questions, and "has room for improvement". Ignatiy Vishnevetsky of The A.V. Club gave the film a rating of "C", calling it a "lousy tribute" and asking, "will anyone who hasn't seen The Room actually be able to piece together a sense of this Z-grade sensation from watching The Disaster Artist?"

=== Accolades ===
Award	Date of ceremony	Category	Recipient(s)	Result	Ref.
Academy Awards	March 4, 2018	Best Adapted Screenplay	Scott Neustadter and Michael H. Weber	Nominated	
Austin Film Critics Association	January 8, 2018	Best Actor	James Franco	Nominated	
Austin Film Critics Association	January 8, 2018	Best Adapted Screenplay	Scott Neustadter and Michael H. Weber	Nominated	
Casting Society of America	January 18, 2018	Studio or Independent – Comedy	Rich Delia	Nominated	
Chicago Film Critics Association	December 12, 2017	Best Actor	James Franco	Nominated	
Chicago Film Critics Association	December 12, 2017	Best Adapted Screenplay	Scott Neustadter and Michael H. Weber	Nominated	
Critics' Choice Movie Awards	January 11, 2018	Best Actor	James Franco	Nominated	
Critics' Choice Movie Awards	January 11, 2018	Best Adapted Screenplay	Scott Neustadter and Michael H. Weber	Nominated	
Critics' Choice Movie Awards	January 11, 2018	Best Comedy	The Disaster Artist	Nominated	
Critics' Choice Movie Awards	January 11, 2018	Best Actor in a Comedy	James Franco	Won	
Dallas–Fort Worth Film Critics Association	December 13, 2017	Best Actor	James Franco	2nd Place	
Detroit Film Critics Society	December 7, 2017	Best Film	The Disaster Artist	Nominated	
Detroit Film Critics Society	December 7, 2017	Best Actor	James Franco	Won	
Dorian Awards	February 24, 2018	Best Performance of the Year – Actor	James Franco	Nominated	
Dorian Awards	February 24, 2018	Campy Film of the Year	The Disaster Artist	Nominated	
Empire Awards	March 18, 2018	Best Comedy	The Disaster Artist	Nominated	
Florida Film Critics Circle	December 23, 2017	Best Actor	James Franco	Nominated	
Florida Film Critics Circle	December 23, 2017	Best Adapted Screenplay	Scott Neustadter and Michael H. Weber	Runner-up	
Georgia Film Critics Association	January 12, 2018	Best Picture	The Disaster Artist	Nominated	
Georgia Film Critics Association	January 12, 2018	Best Actor	James Franco	Nominated	
Georgia Film Critics Association	January 12, 2018	Best Adapted Screenplay	Scott Neustadter and Michael H. Weber	Won	
Golden Globe Awards	January 7, 2018	Best Motion Picture – Musical or Comedy	The Disaster Artist	Nominated	
Golden Globe Awards	January 7, 2018	Best Actor – Motion Picture Musical or Comedy	James Franco	Won	
Golden Tomato Awards	January 3, 2018	Best Comedy Movie 2017	The Disaster Artist	3rd Place	
Gotham Awards	November 27, 2017	Best Actor	James Franco	Won	
Hollywood Film Awards	November 5, 2017	Hollywood Screenwriter Award	Scott Neustadter and Michael H. Weber	Won	
Houston Film Critics Society	January 6, 2018	Best Actor	James Franco	Won	
IGN Awards	December 19, 2017	Best Comedy Movie	The Disaster Artist	Nominated	
IGN Awards	December 19, 2017	Best Lead Performer in a Movie	James Franco	Nominated	
IGN Awards	December 19, 2017	Best Director	James Franco	Nominated	
Independent Spirit Awards	March 3, 2018	Best Male Lead	James Franco	Nominated	
IndieWire Critics Poll	December 19, 2017	Best Actor	James Franco	4th Place	
London Film Critics Circle	January 28, 2018	Actor of the Year	James Franco	Nominated	
Los Angeles Film Critics Association	January 12, 2018	Best Actor	James Franco	Runner-up	
National Board of Review	January 9, 2018	Top Ten Films	The Disaster Artist	Won	
National Board of Review	January 9, 2018	Best Adapted Screenplay	Scott Neustadter and Michael H. Weber	Won	
Online Film Critics Society	December 28, 2017	Best Actor	James Franco	Nominated	
Online Film Critics Society	December 28, 2017	Best Adapted Screenplay	Scott Neustadter and Michael H. Weber	Runner-up	
San Diego Film Critics Society	December 11, 2017	Best Actor	James Franco	Runner-up	
San Diego Film Critics Society	December 11, 2017	Best Adapted Screenplay	Scott Neustadter and Michael H. Weber	Won	
San Diego Film Critics Society	December 11, 2017	Best Comedic Performance	James Franco	Runner-up	
San Francisco Film Critics Circle	December 10, 2017	Best Actor	James Franco	Nominated	
San Francisco Film Critics Circle	December 10, 2017	Best Adapted Screenplay	Scott Neustadter and Michael H. Weber	Nominated	
San Sebastián International Film Festival	September 30, 2017	Golden Shell	The Disaster Artist	Won	
San Sebastián International Film Festival	September 30, 2017	Feroz Zinemaldia Prize	The Disaster Artist	Won	
Satellite Awards	February 10, 2018	Best Actor	James Franco	Nominated	
Satellite Awards	February 10, 2018	Best Adapted Screenplay	Scott Neustadter and Michael H. Weber	Won	
Screen Actors Guild Awards	January 21, 2018	Outstanding Performance by a Male Actor in a Leading Role	James Franco	Nominated	
Seattle Film Critics Society	December 18, 2017	Best Picture	The Disaster Artist	Nominated	
Seattle Film Critics Society	December 18, 2017	Best Actor	James Franco	Nominated	
Seattle Film Critics Society	December 18, 2017	Best Screenplay	Scott Neustadter and Michael H. Weber	Nominated	
St. Louis Film Critics Association	December 17, 2017	Best Actor	James Franco	Runner-up	
St. Louis Film Critics Association	December 17, 2017	Best Adapted Screenplay	Scott Neustadter and Michael H. Weber	Won	
St. Louis Film Critics Association	December 17, 2017	Best Scene	Sixty-seven takes of "I did not hit her"	Won	
Toronto International Film Festival	September 17, 2017	People's Choice Award, Midnight Madness	The Disaster Artist	2nd Place	
USC Scripter Awards	February 10, 2018	Best Screenplay	Scott Neustadter, Michael H. Weber, Greg Sestero and Tom Bissell	Nominated	
Washington D.C. Area Film Critics Association	December 8, 2017	Best Actor	James Franco	Nominated	
Washington D.C. Area Film Critics Association	December 8, 2017	Best Adapted Screenplay	Scott Neustadter and Michael H. Weber	Nominated	
Writers Guild of America Awards	February 11, 2018	Best Adapted Screenplay	Scott Neustadter and Michael H. Weber	Nominated	

== Accuracy ==
Although based on a true story, the film dramatizes and omits several events:

- In the film, Wiseau is inspired to write The Room a vehicle film for himself and Sestero; in real life, Wiseau was inspired to write it after seeing The Talented Mr. Ripley, and originally began writing it as a play.
- Greg's mother is a native French speaker and thus has a corresponding accent, which Greg used for his role in the horror movie Retro Puppet Master. Megan Mullally's portrayal of his mother does not have a distinct accent.
- Although the film depicts Sestero eagerly accepting the role of Mark, it is detailed in the memoir that Sestero only reluctantly accepted after Wiseau offered to buy him a car and pay him a significant salary. Wiseau had already cast a separate actor, and claimed the film's producers had asked him to use Sestero instead during the first day of shooting.
- The restaurant scene where Tommy accosts a rude film producer, played by Judd Apatow, is entirely fictional. The producer himself is fictional and meant to be an amalgam of other producers. Apatow later stated that James Franco tricked him into playing a version of himself as a "generic asshole producer", though he did not initially realize that when being cast. Franco and Apatow claim that the latter is not that bad in real life.
- While the turmoil on set is depicted in the film, the real-life production had a much higher turnover rate, going through three different sets of crew (opposed to just the two members fired in the film).
- Though the film depicts the line "beat her up so bad she ended up in a hospital on Guerrero Street" as scripted, it is revealed in the memoir that the "Guerrero Street" portion of the line was improvised by Sestero in an attempt to elicit emotion from Wiseau (who owned an apartment located on Guerrero Street in San Francisco), due to the crew's frustration over his jovial reaction to a scripted story of domestic abuse. In the memoir, it is claimed that Wiseau was infuriated by the line, and confronted Sestero about it after shooting had concluded, an event which does not occur in the film.
- At the time The Disaster Artist is set, Greg had never met Bryan Cranston in real life, and was not forced to choose between The Room and shooting an episode of Malcolm in the Middle. He was reluctant to shave his beard due to wanting to dissociate himself from The Room after its release.
- The film depicts Sestero confronting Wiseau during filming in San Francisco: questioning his mysterious source of wealth, dubious "Louisiana" background, and his undisclosed age, leading Wiseau to tackle Sestero out of frustration. In the memoir, a similar event occurs, though this is a result of Sestero speaking to Wiseau in French.
- While the film depicts the premiere of The Room being met with laughter and applause, the real initial screening was received poorly and many audience members walked out in the first five minutes; it took time for its cult status to develop. Despite this, the memoir details a similar reaction from Sestero's family upon viewing a rough cut of The Room.
