= Kathryn Johnston =

Kathryn Johnston may refer to:

- Kathryn Johnston (1914–2006), victim in a 2006 police shooting in Atlanta
- Kathryn Johnston Massar, baseball player
- Catharine Johnston (1794–1871), English botanical illustrator

== See also ==
- Katharine Johnson (disambiguation)
