= Olivia Taylor Dudley =

American actress

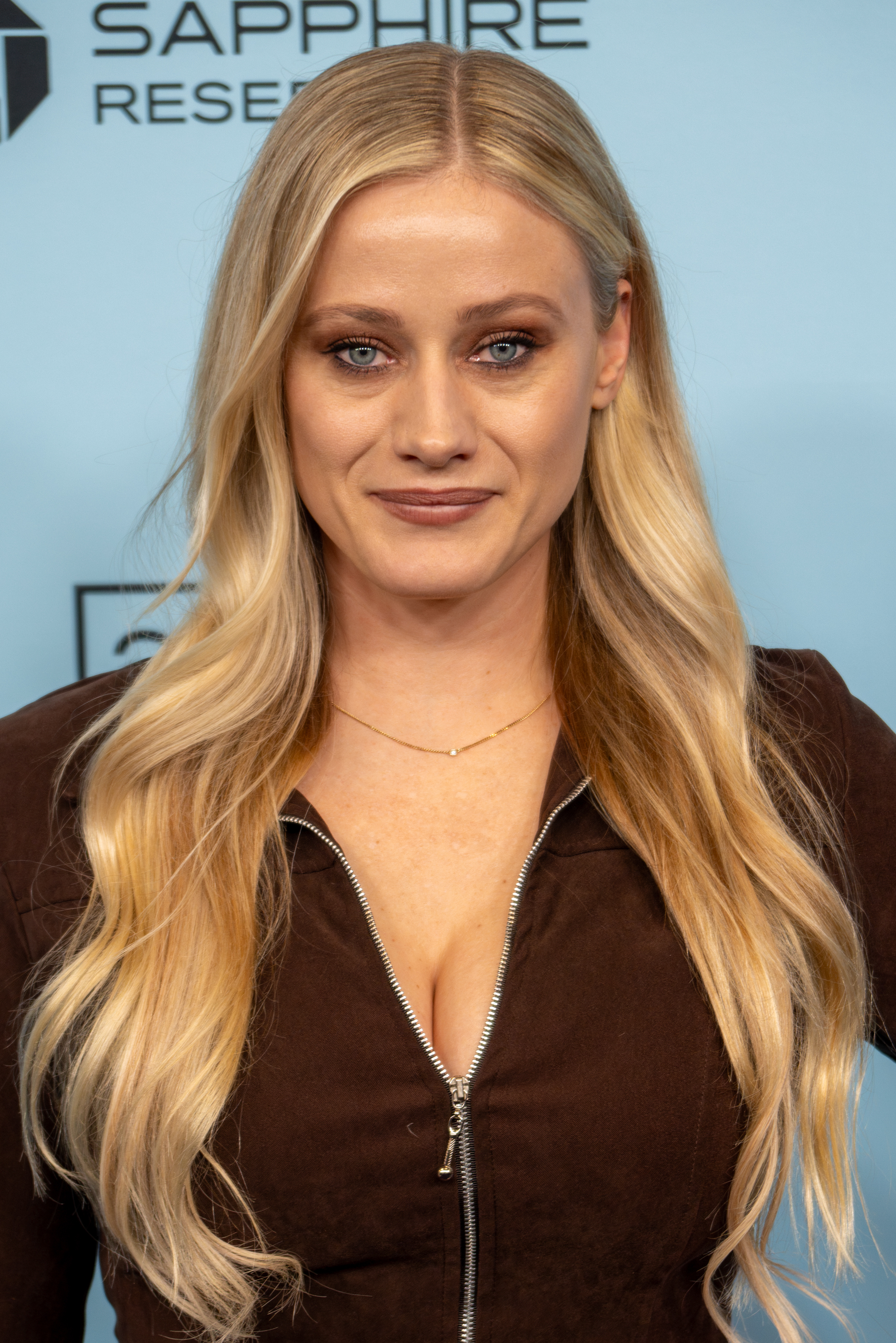
- Dudley at the 2025 Sundance Film Festival
- Born: November 4, 1985 (age 40); Morro Bay, California, U.S.
- Occupation: Actress
- Years active: 2007–present
- Spouse: Elie Smolkin (m. 2023)

Olivia Taylor Dudley (born November 4, 1985) is an American actress. She is known for her horror film roles such as Chernobyl Diaries (2012), The Vatican Tapes (2015) and Paranormal Activity: The Ghost Dimension (2015), for her television roles such as the Syfy fantasy series The Magicians, and for her work in the internet sketch group 5-Second Films.

== Early life ==
Dudley was born in Morro Bay, California to Jim Dudley and Saundra Dudley. She moved to Los Angeles when she was 17 and has been acting ever since.

== Career ==
Dudley earned her first major film role in the 2012 thriller Chernobyl Diaries. In 2013, she was cast in the 2015 demonic possession drama film The Vatican Tapes playing the possession victim Angela Holmes; Dudley's portrayal in the film earned positive notice from The New York Times reviewer Nicolas Rapold. Dudley's other notable movies include Chillerama, Paranormal Activity: The Ghost Dimension, Dumbbells, The Barber, and Dude Bro Party Massacre III.

Dudley's television roles include appearances on CSI: Miami and Arrested Development. In August 2015, she earned the regular role of Alice in Syfy's drama fantasy series The Magicians. In mid 2016, Dudley guest-starred opposite David Duchovny in the second season of NBC's Aquarius.

== Personal life ==
Dudley married director of photography Elie Smolkin in September 2023.

== Filmography ==
Film roles
Year	Title	Role	Notes
2007	The Anna Nicole Smith Story	Kristine Summers	as Olivia Dudley
2008	Remembering Phil	Cristine	as Olivia Dudley
2011	Birds of a Feather	Kristin	as Olivia Dudley
2011	Chillerama	Nurse Unger / Laura	Segments: "Wadzilla" / "Zom-B-Movie"; as Olivia Dudley
2012	Chernobyl Diaries	Natalie	
2014	Dumbbells	Heather	as Olivia Dudley
2014	Transcendence	Groupie	
2014	The Barber	Kelli	as Olivia Dudley
2015	Appleton	Gracie	as Olivia Dudley
2015	Dude Bro Party Massacre III	Motherface	
2015	The Vatican Tapes	Angela Krauser	
2015	Paranormal Activity: The Ghost Dimension	Skyler	
2019	Where We Go From Here	Elena Peterson	
2020	She Dies Tomorrow	Erin	
2021	Some of Our Stallions	Bonnie	
2022	Crawlspace	Carrie	
2023	Onyx the Fortuitous and the Talisman of Souls	Farrah	Also producer
2025	Touch Me	Christine J.Lace	
2025	Abigail Before Beatrice	Beatrice	

Television roles
Year	Title	Role	Notes
2011	NCIS	Jancey Gilroy	Episode: "Freedom"
2011–2012	CSI: Miami	Elizabeth Clark	Episodes: "Look Who's Taunting", "Dead Ringer", "Rest in Pieces"
2012	Don't Trust the B— in Apartment 23	Katarina	Episode: "A Weekend in the Hamptons..."
2013	The Mindy Project	Christina	Episode: "The One That Got Away"; as Kolivia Taylor Dudley
2013	Arrested Development	Rose	Episode: "It Gets Better"
2013–2014	Uproxx Video	Kristina	Web series; 8 episodes
2015	The Comedians	Barista	Episodes: Pilot, "Celebrity Guest", "Charity"
2015–2020	The Magicians	Alice Krauser Quinn	Main role
2016	Aquarius	Billie Gunderson	Recurring role, 5 episodes
2017	Curb Your Enthusiasm	Alex Jo El	Episode: "Fatwa!"
2021–2023	Nancy Drew	Charity Hudson Dow	Recurring role (season 3)
2009–2024	5 Second Films	Various	56 episodes
2024	Grey Rabbit	Blake	Episode: "Shutter" (season 2)
