= Max Arciniega =

American actor

- Born: Maximino Arciniega; Chicago, Illinois, U.S.
- Education: Columbia College Chicago

Maximino Arciniega is an American actor, best known for his portrayal of Domingo Gallardo "Krazy-8" Molina in the crime drama television series Breaking Bad and its prequel spin-off Better Call Saul.

A native of the Northwest side of Chicago, Arciniega graduated from Columbia College Chicago with a BA in Theater.

== Early life and career ==
According to official data, Arciniega was born in Chicago, Illinois, to Mexican immigrants. He grew up in the Hermosa neighborhood in the northwest side of Chicago, and graduated from Steinmetz High School. He attended Columbia College Chicago and graduated with a B.A. in theater. Arciniega gained fame after playing drug dealer Krazy-8 in the first season of AMC crime drama Breaking Bad, a role he reprised in the spinoff/prequel series Better Call Saul. He has also made appearances in The Wingwalker (2024)and Old Henry (2021).

== Filmography ==
=== Film ===
Year	Title	Role	Notes
2004	Barbershop 2: Back in Business	Customer	
2011	Valley of the Sun	Younger Cop	
2011	Haywire	Gomez	
2014	The Barber	Luis Ramirez	
2020	Hard Luck Love Song	Medina	
2021	Love and Baseball	Will Reyes	
2021	Old Henry	Stilwell	
2024	A Journey to the Heart, the Wingwalker	Rambo	

=== Television ===
Year	Title	Role	Notes
2005	Surface	Lula	Episode #1.9
2006	E-Ring	Air Traffic Controller	Episode: "Fallen Angels"
2006	Veronica Mars	Cervando Esparza	Episode: "I Am God"
2006	3 lbs	Jose	2 episodes
2007	Private Practice	Paul Gonzales	Episode: "In Which We Meet Addison, a Nice Girl from Somewhere Else"
2008	Without a Trace	Keith	Episode: "4G"
2008	Breaking Bad	Krazy-8	3 episodes
2008	Lincoln Heights	Blade	Episode: "Number One with a Bullet"
2008	The Unit	Octavio Jr.	Episode: "The Conduit"
2009	ER	Nick Vasquez	Episode: "Dream Runner"
2009	Lie to Me	Miguel	Episode: "Control Factor"
2010	Blue Bloods	Esteban Torres	Episode: "Brothers"
2011	Off the Map	David	Episode: "It's a Leaf"
2012	Fringe	Antonio Dawes	Episode: "Everything in Its Right Place"
2012	Castle	Billy Bash	Episode: "Swan Song"
2014	Grimm	Diego Hoyos	Episode: "Chupacabra"
2015	Blood & Oil	Star Pavon	4 episodes
2016	NCIS: New Orleans	Victor Ortega	Episode: "Undocumented"
2016	Full Circle	Alex Hidell	3 episodes
2016–2020	Better Call Saul	Domingo Molina	7 episodes
2017	Colony	Edison	5 episodes
2017	Bosch	Xavi	7 episodes
2017	Chance	Cesar	Episode: "A Madness of Two"
2019	Unbelievable	Jason Alvarez	4 episodes
2023	Snowfall	Miguel Flores	Episode: "The Struggle"
2023	Power Book IV: Force	Naci	2 episodes
