= Kathy Johnson (disambiguation) =

Kathy Johnson (born 1959) is an American sports commentator and former artistic gymnast.

Kathy Johnson may also refer to:

- Kathy Johnson (figure skating coach), figure skating coach and modern dance instructor
- Kathy Johnson (academic administrator), American developmental psychologist and academic administrator
- Kathie Lee Johnson or Kathie Lee Gifford (born 1953), American singer and television personality

== See also ==
- Cathy Johnston or Cathy Johnston-Forbes (born 1963), American golfer
- Katharine Johnson (disambiguation)
