= Extra Lives =

2010 non-fiction book

Extra Lives: Why Video Games Matter
- Author: Tom Bissell
- Language: English
- Subject: Video Games, Culture
- Genre: Memoir, Commentary
- Publisher: Pantheon Books
- Publication date: 2010
- Media type: Book
- ISBN: 978-0-307-37870-5

Extra Lives: Why Video Games Matter is a 2010 non-fiction book by journalist and critic Tom Bissell discussing the social relevance and importance of video games as well as defending the medium against detractors. Bissell takes a slightly ambivalent stance towards the cultural relevance of the medium, describing the conflict between gameplay and narrative advances and the possibility for the medium to be relegated to the belief that games are incompatible with traditional art forms. Bissell extols several then-recent games in his book, particularly Braid, Grand Theft Auto IV, Mass Effect and Fallout 3 for their exemplification of the artistic advances made in the effort to gain social relevancy.

Gamasutra praised Bissell as one of the industry's most influential voices in "The Game Developer 50" (2010) for his work in Extra Lives. "In clever language, he discusses the importance of games as a cultural and social movement, arguing their validity as an artform, but without preaching to — or necessarily appearing to be part of — the crowd."
