= The Ojai Apartments =

Apartment building in Hollywood, California. U.S.

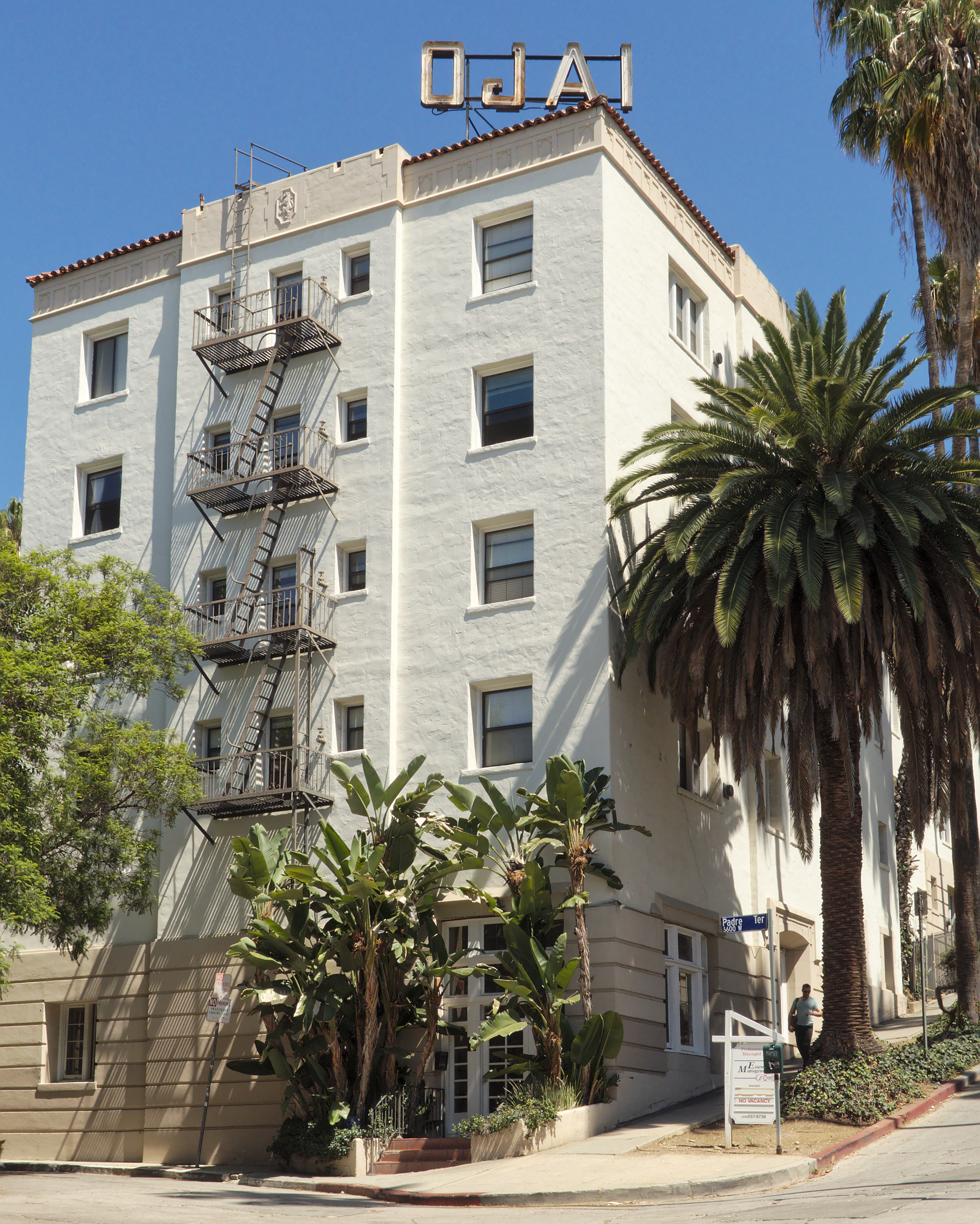
- The building in 2015
- Interactive map of the The Ojai Apartments area

General information
- Architectural style: Mediterranean Revival
- Location: 1929 N. Whitley Ave., Hollywood, Los Angeles, California
- Coordinates: 34°06′27″N 118°20′0.1″W
- Completed: 1928

Design and construction
- Architect: Frank H. Webster

Los Angeles Historic-Cultural Monument
- Designated: May 10, 2006
- Reference no.: 842

The Ojai Apartments is an historic Mediterranean Revival apartment building at 1929 N. Whitley Ave., at the intersection of Whitley with Padre Terrace, in Hollywood, California. It is Los Angeles Historic-Cultural Monument #842.

== History ==
The Ojai Apartments were designed by Frank H. Webster, architect of the historic landmark Villa Bonita, and built by the Cooper Construction Company in 1928. It features five stories facing Padre Terrace and four stories facing its northern end at Emmet Terrace. It has terracotta roof tiles and a rooftop neon sign. The complex was designated a Los Angeles Historic-Cultural Monument in May 2006.

== In popular culture ==
The Ojai was used as the residence of the fictional Tommy Wiseau in James Franco's The Disaster Artist. The use of the building is thought to be a double entendre on Tommy Wiseau's infamous The Room character's habit of greeting other characters with a perfunctory "Oh, hi."
