= Kay Johnson (disambiguation) =

Kay Johnson (1904–1975) was an American actress.

Kay Johnson may also refer to:

- Kay Johnson (athlete) (born 1940), Australian sprinter
- Kay Ann Johnson (1946–2019), American scholar of Asian studies
- Kay Cousins Johnson (1923–1980), American actress and screenwriter
- Kay Johnson-Gentile, American musician and educator

== See also ==
- Katharine Johnson (disambiguation)
