= Dude Bro Party Massacre III =

- Promotional poster
- Directed by: Tomm Jacobsen; Michael Rousselet; Jon Salmon
- Screenplay by: Alec Owen
- Story by: Alec Owen; Timothy Ciancio; Brian Firenzi; Ben Gigli; Tomm Jacobsen; Mike James; Michael E. Peter; Michael Rousselet; Jon Salmon; Joey Scoma
- Produced by: Michael E. Peter; Sarah Farrand; Ben Gigli; Dave Gare; Jon Worley
- Starring: Alec Owen; Paul Prado; Ben Gigli; Jon Salmon; Mike James; Joey Scoma; Michael Rousselet; Kelsey Gunn; Jon Salmon; Olivia Taylor Dudley; Brian Firenzi; Maria del Carmen
- Cinematography: Jon Salmon
- Edited by: Brian Firenzi
- Music by: Tyler Burton (score); Spencer Owen (songs)
- Production companies: 5-Second Films; Snoot Entertainment
- Distributed by: 5-Second Films
- Release dates: June 13, 2015 (LAFF); July 7, 2015 (United States)
- Running time: 103 minutes
- Country: United States
- Language: English

Dude Bro Party Massacre III is a 2015 American comedy slasher film created by the comedy troupe 5-Second Films. It was directed by Jon Salmon, Michael Rousselet, and Tomm Jacobsen. Despite the title, it is not a sequel, and there are no previous installments. Presented as a lost film that was banned in the 1980s, it tells the story of a masked killer known as Motherface, who targets fraternity brothers.

== Plot ==
Delta Bi member Brock Chirino talks to his therapist about the multiple slasher-related attacks on his fraternity because of their pranks. As result of these pranks, a sorority house mother was trapped in a burning building and vowed revenge on them. The mother goes on a rampage and kills most of Delta Bi. Brock and his friend Samzy manage to kill the mother, only for her daughter to cut off her face and use it as a mask, taking up the name Motherface.

Motherface begins her own rampage, killing more of Delta Bi. Eventually, Brock lights Motherface on fire and kills her. In the present day, the therapist grabs a pair of scissors and, revealing herself to be the new Motherface and the previous Motherface's sister, slashes Brock's throat. Brock's brother Brent joins Delta Bi while trying to discover his brother's killer. He befriends a crippled Nedry, Samzy, Derek, Todd, and his girlfriend Samantha, Turbeaux, who is scared of dogs, ZQ, Sizzler, Turtleneck Bro, Flannel Bro, and a beer addicted Spike. During a prank, Nedry and Brent accidentally cause a plane crash. Because of the plane crash, Dean Pepperstone sends Delta Bi to the lake house. After they leave, Motherface stabs Pepperstone to death.

Delta Bi meets with the river raft salesman, Paddy, whose family died during a flood caused in the past by Delta Bi. Delta Bi gets the rafts and leaves behind Nedry. They arrive at the house and begin to clean it up. Motherface spies Paddy on a raft and almost shoots him with an arrow, only for Paddy to commit suicide by shooting himself through the mouth. Motherface cuts the power, and Delta Bi sends Derek to fix it. Motherface rams a hoe into the back of Derek's head, pushing it into the circuit and electrocuting him to death. Later at the house, Brent goes into the attic and finds Samzy, who tries to dance with Brent, only for Brent to accidentally drop Samzy's head on the floor, snapping his neck. Motherface then ambushes Spike, trying to find more beer, and kills him by stabbing him in the head with a beer tap and draining his brains. She also makes him drink his own blood.

Samantha and Todd have sex in a tent before Motherface stabs Todd through the tent with a machete. Samantha is oblivious and falls asleep. ZQ and Sizzler go into the woods, and a tree crushes ZQ before Motherface bisects him. The next day, Delta Bi finds ZQ's corpse and runs into the house, with Turbeaux knocking out Samantha with a baseball bat. Samzy reveals that he has a robot duplicate in the attic, but Brent realizes that he has killed him. Motherface throws his head through the window and uses a device to make Samzy rip out his tongue by the lake before drowning him. Motherface then rips out Sizzler's heart and flushes his insides down a toilet.

Turbeaux is locked in a room full of dogs and uses a gun to shoot himself. Samantha finds Sizzler's body and reveals to Brent that Todd impregnated her before Motherface appears behind her with a fire poker and stabs her through the stomach, killing her child. Motherface then pulls the poker up, vertically slicing Samantha in half. Brent finds a badly wounded Flannel Bro and Turtleneck Bro in the woods before Motherface stabs both of their heads with a javelin. Motherface attacks Brent with a tomahawk, but Nedry saves him, only for Motherface to throw a tomahawk into Nedry's head, killing him. The spirits of all the dead Delta Bi strengthen Brent, and he uses the power to beat Motherface to death.

== Cast ==
- Alec Owen as Brent / Brock
- Jon Salmon as Nedry
- Paul Prado as Turbeaux
- Greg Sestero as Derek
- Jimmy Wong as Sizzler
- Ben Gigli as Samzy
- Joey Scoma as Todd
- Kelsey Gunn as Samantha
- Olivia Taylor Dudley as Motherface
- Patton Oswalt as the chief of police
- Brian Firenzi as Officer Sminkle
- Maria Del Carmen as Officer Candace Buttiker
- Nina Hartley as Dean Pepperstone
- Robert Daniel Sloan as Pizza Child 1
- Dartanian Sloan as Pizza Child 2
- Katie J. Stone as Becky

Andrew W.K., John Francis Daley, Larry King, and TomSka appear in cameos.

== Production ==
The film is comedy troupe 5-Second Films' first feature and is a standalone film without any previous installments. It is based on a five-second short. When this proved popular, they created a fake trailer. To finance a feature-length adaptation, 5-Second Films launched a $200,000 crowdfunding campaign. The whole comedy troupe was assigned writing duties, but they were restricted from collaborating with each other. Alec Owen assembled the screenplay from the disparate scenes to create the first draft, and was named as the film's head writer to complete the final screenplay. There was a good deal of improv on set that made it into the final movie. Oswalt had previously collaborated with the troupe on short films, and Sestero knew co-director Rousselet through Rousselet's promotion of The Room as a cult film. Owen said Dude Bro was a reaction to how other films glorified objectionable behavior. Although written as "a sort of feminist film", it was intentionally designed to fail the Bechdel test to satirize the sexism that dominated the preceding films of its genre.

== Release ==
Dude Bro Party Massacre III premiered at the Los Angeles Film Festival on June 13, 2015. It was released digitally on July 7. Despite being listed as 103 minutes long the film is actually 93 minutes with 10 minutes of Kickstarter credits scroll listing all 4,000 donors.

== Reception ==
Rotten Tomatoes, a review aggregator, reports that 93% of 15 surveyed critics gave the film a positive review; the average rating is 6.9/10. Carlos Aguilar of IndieWire wrote, "Its form and its ideas come together in a disgusting, profane, vulgar, and psychotic concoction that will become, without a doubt, an instant cult classic." Elijah Taylor of Fangoria rated it 3/4 stars and wrote that it "managed to exceed or subvert nearly every expectation I had". At Bloody Disgusting, Patrick Cooper rated the film 4/5 stars and wrote, "The jokes hit hard and fast and the whole film's quotable as hell." In rating it 2/5 stars, Matt Boiselle of Dread Central recommended it only to fans of "low-budgeted campy slashers". Comparing it to Wet Hot American Summer, Mark L. Miller of Ain't It Cool News called it "some of the dumbest fun you're going to have while watching a horror film this year".
