= The Vatican Tapes =

- Theatrical release poster
- Directed by: Mark Neveldine
- Screenplay by: Christopher Borrelli; Michael C. Martin
- Story by: Christopher Borrelli; Chris Morgan
- Produced by: Chris Cowles; Gary Lucchesi; Chris Morgan; Tom Rosenberg
- Starring: Olivia Taylor Dudley; Michael Peña; Dougray Scott; Djimon Hounsou
- Cinematography: Gerardo Mateo Madrazo
- Edited by: Eric Potter
- Music by: Joseph Bishara
- Production companies: H2F Entertainment; Lakeshore Entertainment
- Distributed by: Lionsgate; Pantelion Films
- Release date: July 24, 2015
- Running time: 91 minutes
- Country: United States
- Languages: English; Aramaic
- Budget: $13 million
- Box office: $14.9 million

The Vatican Tapes is a 2015 American supernatural horror film directed by Mark Neveldine from a screenplay written by Christopher Borrelli and Michael C. Martin, based on a story conceived by Borrelli and Chris Morgan.

The film stars Olivia Taylor Dudley, Michael Peña, Dougray Scott, Djimon Hounsou, Peter Andersson, Kathleen Robertson, and John Patrick Amedori, and was released on July 24, 2015, by Lionsgate.

== Plot ==
In the Vatican, Vicar Imani shows Cardinal Mattias Bruun the case of Angela Holmes, a young American woman who is suspected of harboring an evil spirit.

Two months earlier in the United States, Angela is given a surprise birthday party by her father, Roger, and her boyfriend, Pete Smith. She accidentally cuts herself and is rushed to the hospital, where she briefly meets Father Lozano. She is injected with a serum that causes an infection; at home, she experiences a seizure and is placed under care at a hospital. A few days later, she is released, but in the taxi on the way home, she violently grabs the wheel, causing an accident that puts her in a coma for 40 days. Just as her life support is about to be switched off, she comes round, seemingly in perfect health.

However, Angela begins to show symptoms of demonic possession when she almost drowns a baby, followed by forcing a detective to commit suicide. Lozano sends her to a psychiatric hospital. A distraught Roger confesses that Angela's mother was a prostitute; she is pregnant just a few months after Roger met her but abandoned the baby at birth leaving Angela to be raised by Roger. Angela's possession becomes worse; she taunts her psychiatrist, Dr. Richards, eventually culminating in her speaking in Aramaic that induces hysteria and mass suicide in her fellow patients. Deciding that nothing can save her, the hospital releases her.

Cardinal Bruun concludes that Angela is possessed by the Antichrist due to the presence of the ravens around her, which are agents of Satan, and instructs Imani to stay back while he heads to the United States to cure her. An exorcism he plans involves a Eucharist, where Angela reacts by vomiting blood and spitting three eggs, meant to symbolize a perverted Trinity. Bruun also comments that her birth from a prostitute perverts the virgin birth of Jesus Christ. Bruun then realizes that the Antichrist is already a part of Angela; killing him would mean Angela's death as well. Just after Bruun kills Angela, she rises up as the resurrected Antichrist, mirroring the resurrection of Jesus, and kills Bruun, Roger, and Pete. She spares Lozano and tells him to inform the Vatican that the Antichrist is roaming the Earth.

Three months later, Lozano, having been released from the hospital, visits the Vatican and is allowed access to the archives by Imani. He is shown footage of what has happened since: Angela returns as the only "survivor" of the exorcism besides Lozano and is now performing miracles to gather followers. She enters a large arena to greet her followers by stretching out her arms.

== Cast ==
- Olivia Taylor Dudley as Angela Krauser
- Michael Peña as Father Oscar Lozano
- Dougray Scott as Roger Antos, Angela's father
- Djimon Hounsou as Vicar Imani
- Peter Andersson as Cardinal Mattias Bruun
- Kathleen Robertson as Dr. Richards, Angela's psychiatrist
- John Patrick Amedori as Peter "Pete" Smith, Angela's boyfriend
- Michael Paré as Detective Harris
- Alex Sparrow as Resident Kulik
- Cas Anvar as Dr. Fahti
- Alison Lohman as Psych Patient

== Production ==
Principal photography began in July 2013 in Los Angeles.

== Release ==
=== Box office ===
The Vatican Tapes opened theatrically on July 24, 2015 in 427 venues, earning $832,271 in its first weekend, ranking fifteenth in the United States box office and last among the week's new releases. The film finished its theatrical run four weeks later, on August 20, having grossed $1.8 million domestically. Overseas, the film made $13.1 million, giving the film a worldwide total of $14.9 million, based on an estimated $13 million budget.

=== Critical reception ===
The film received generally negative reviews from critics. On Rotten Tomatoes, the film has a rating of 20%, based on 46 reviews. The site's critical consensus reads, "A loud, rote exorcism thriller that presents nothing new to an already overpopulated subgenre." On Metacritic, the film has a score of 38 out of 100, based on 12 critics, indicating "generally unfavorable reviews". Audiences surveyed by CinemaScore gave the film an average grade of "C" on an A+ to F scale. IGN awarded it a score of 2.5 out of ten, saying "It exists without any real scares or chills, and only the smallest attempt to differentiate itself."
