= Touch Me (2025 film) =

2025 sci-fi horror comedy film

- Theatrical release poster
- Directed by: Addison Heimann
- Written by: Addison Heimann
- Produced by: Addison Heimann; John Humber; David Lawson Jr.
- Starring: Olivia Taylor Dudley; Jordan Gavaris; Lou Taylor Pucci; Marlene Forte; Paget Brewster
- Cinematography: Dustin Supencheck
- Edited by: Jess Weber
- Music by: Jimmy LaValle
- Production company: Rustic Films
- Distributed by: Yellow Veil Pictures
- Release dates: January 2025 (Sundance); March 20, 2026 (limited theatre release)
- Running time: 99 minutes
- Country: United States
- Language: English

Touch Me is a 2025 sci-fi psychosexual horror comedy film directed by Addison Heimann and starring Olivia Taylor Dudley, Jordan Gavaris, Lou Taylor Pucci, and Paget Brewster. The film premiered at the 2025 Sundance Film Festival.

== Plot ==
The film's premise revolves around two codependent friends, Joey, a woman riddled with obsessive-compulsive disorder and childhood trauma, and Craig, her gay friend. They become homeless after a series of events leave their home uninhabitable. Joey's former boyfriend Brian reappears in her life, wanting her back. Brian is an alien whose powers make problems like anxiety and depression disappear. However, beneath his façade, Brian conceals a plan filled with horrors that range from murder to other dark themes. Lured to his secluded compound, Joey and Craig will face violence and danger while discovering Brian's true side.

== Cast ==
- Olivia Taylor Dudley as Joey
- Jordan Gavaris as Craig
- Lou Taylor Pucci as Brian
- Marlene Forte as Laura
- Paget Brewster
- Ashley Lauren Nedd as Dr. Kelly
- JJ Phillips as Noah
- Yumarie Morales as Celeste
- Eli Lucas as River

== Reception ==
On the review aggregator website Rotten Tomatoes, 85% of 46 critics' reviews are positive. The website's consensus reads: "An impressively gross and inventive allegory for relationships, Touch Me's tentacles will be hard to shake off for those open-minded enough to accept its allure." On Metacritic, the film has a weighted average score of 52 out of 100 based on 6 critics, which the site labels as "mixed or average" reviews.

Catherine Bray of The Guardian gave the movie three out of five stars, while Murtada Elfadl of Variety considered that Touch Me was not a fully realized movie. Writing for IndieWire, Chase Hutchinson gave the film a negative review, calling its scenes "obnoxious" and "overlong," adding that Touch Me is a "misguided" sci-fi horror movie that never reaches a climax. Josh Pearce of Locus magazine gave the film a mixed review, highlighting Taylor Dudley and Gavaris for their acting, but criticizing the use of Hentai-like scenes. Adam Manery, writing for his review website, gave the movie a mixed assessment, highlighting the deliberate depiction of trauma and abuse.
