= Dave Franco =

American actor (born 1985)

- Franco in 2025
- Born: David John Franco; June 12, 1985 (age 41); Palo Alto, California, U.S.
- Education: University of Southern California
- Occupations: Actor; producer; screenwriter; director
- Years active: 2006–present
- Spouse: Alison Brie (m. 2017)
- Relatives: James Franco (brother); Tom Franco (brother)

David John Franco (born June 12, 1985) is an American actor and filmmaker. He began his career with small roles in films such as Superbad (2007) and Charlie St. Cloud (2010). Following a starring role in the ninth season of the comedy series Scrubs (2009–2010), Franco had his film breakthrough with a supporting role in the buddy comedy film 21 Jump Street (2012).

Franco has also starred in Fright Night (2011), Now You See Me (2013) and its sequels Now You See Me 2 (2016) and Now You See Me: Now You Don't (2025), Neighbors (2014) and its sequel Neighbors 2: Sorority Rising (2016), Nerve (2016), The Disaster Artist (2017), and Day Shift (2022). He has also voiced roles in The Lego Movie (2014), The Lego Ninjago Movie (2017), Hoppers, and Forgotten Island (both 2026). In 2020, he made his directorial debut with The Rental, starring his wife Alison Brie. The pair also starred together in Together (2025).

== Early life and education ==
David John Franco was born in Palo Alto, California to Betsy Lou (née Verne; born 1947), a poet, children's book author, and editor, and Douglas Eugene Franco (1948–2011), who ran a nonprofit agency and a business; the two met as students at Stanford University. Franco's father was of Portuguese (from Madeira) and Swedish descent. Franco's mother is Jewish (of Russian Jewish descent); her parents had changed the surname from "Verovitz" to "Verne". Franco's paternal grandmother, Marjorie (Peterson) Franco, is an author of young adult books. Franco's maternal grandmother, Mitzie (Levine) Verne, owned the Verne Art Gallery, a prominent art gallery in Cleveland, and was an active member in the National Council of Jewish Women. Franco grew up in California with his two older brothers, James and Tom, both of whom are also actors.

Franco studied at the University of Southern California, and originally envisioned himself as a high school teacher teaching creative writing, until his sophomore year, when his brother James's manager guided him to a theater class, and he began to take an interest in acting. Franco first became interested in filmmaking while working at a video rental store when he was 14; he was paid in free movie rentals, as he was under the legal working age.

== Career ==
=== 2000s ===
In 2006, Franco made his acting debut on The CW drama television series 7th Heaven. He subsequently appeared in television shows such as Do Not Disturb and Young Justice. Franco also had noticeable roles in films, including Superbad and The Shortcut. In May 2008, he was cast in a major occurring role in the CW teen drama television series Privileged. The series premiered on September 9, 2008, to 3.1 million viewers. Ratings continued to slip each week, with the series' sixth episode reaching 1.837 million viewers. The CW did not renew the series for a second season due to low ratings.

In August 2009, Variety announced Franco had been cast in a regular role for the ninth season of the ABC sitcom Scrubs. Portraying the role of Cole Aaronson, Franco went on to appear in all thirteen episodes of the ninth season and received praise from critics for his performance; however, the ninth was the final season of the series.

=== 2010s ===
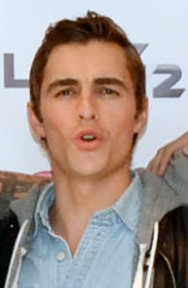
Franco at an LG Electronics event in 2013

MTV Networks' NextMovie.com named Franco one of its "Breakout Stars to Watch For" in 2011.

In April 2012, Shalom Life ranked him and his brother James at number 2 on its list of "the 50 most talented, intelligent, funny, and gorgeous Jewish men in the world". In March 2012, Franco starred in the Columbia Pictures action comedy film 21 Jump Street, based on the 1987 television series of the same name.

In 2013, he co-starred in the zombie romance film Warm Bodies, an adaptation of the best-selling novel of the same name. The same year, Franco appeared in the ensemble crime thriller film Now You See Me.

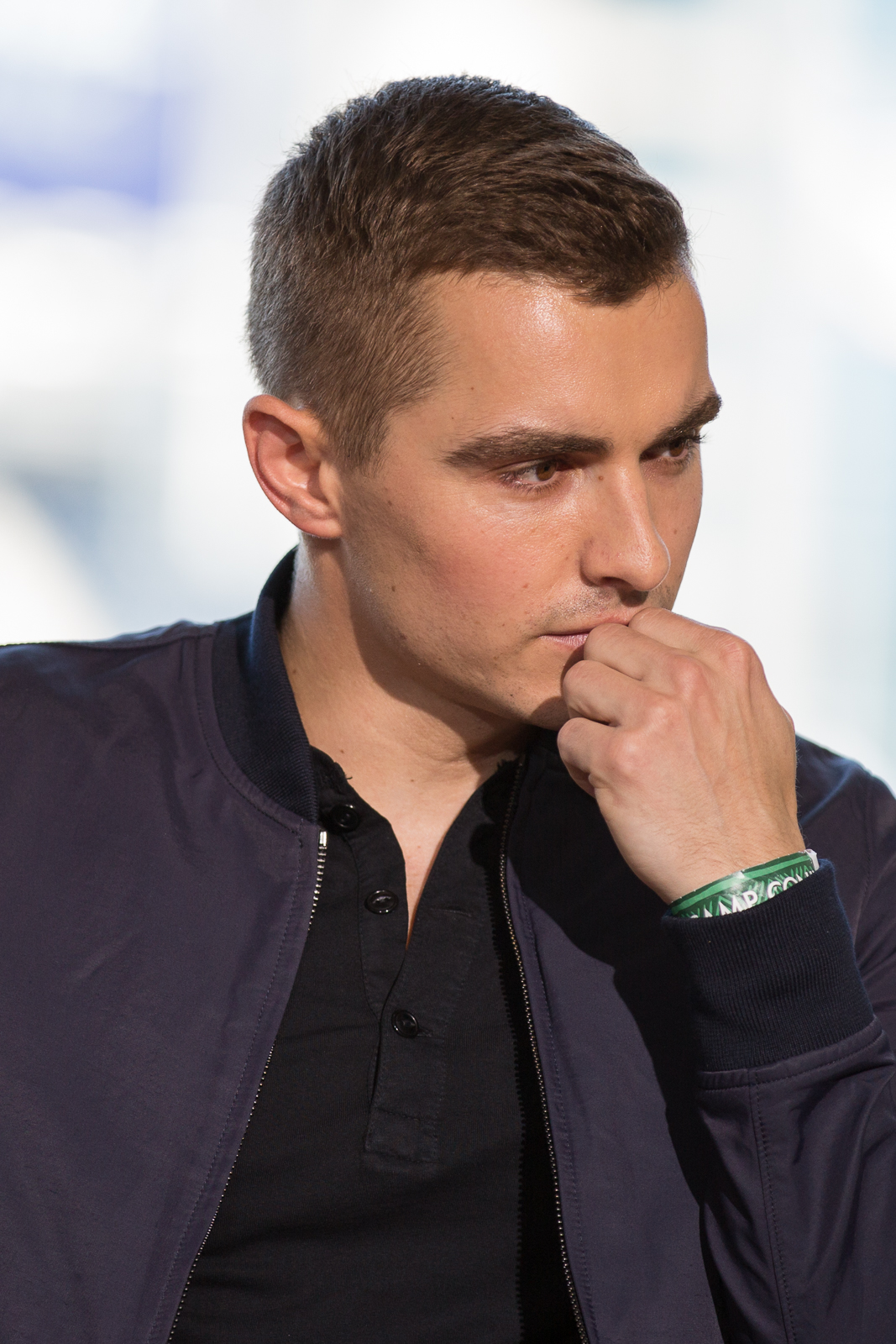
Franco at the 2016 San Diego Comic-Con

Franco's 2014 roles included the Seth Rogen comedy Neighbors and a cameo appearance in 22 Jump Street. For the former, Franco won an MTV Movie Award for Best On-Screen Duo, alongside Zac Efron. A pre-planned skit performed during their acceptance speech, involving both of them dressed as Robert De Niro characters and squeezing each other's crotches, sparked media backlash. In 2015, he co-starred with Vince Vaughn and Tom Wilkinson in the comedy Unfinished Business.

In 2016, he reprised prior roles in the sequels Neighbors 2: Sorority Rising, as Pete, and Now You See Me 2, as Jack Wilder. The following year, Franco appeared in the well-received comedy The Little Hours, and the acclaimed biographical comedy-drama, The Disaster Artist, which was directed by James Franco.

In 2018, Franco starred in the addiction drama 6 Balloons opposite Abbi Jacobson, for Netflix. Franco then had a small role in If Beale Street Could Talk, directed by Barry Jenkins. In 2019, a film that had been shot in 2014 was released, titled Zeroville; Franco portrayed the role of actor Montgomery Clift. He next featured in the action-thriller 6 Underground, directed by Michael Bay.

=== 2020s ===
In 2020, Franco made his directorial debut on the horror-thriller The Rental, from a screenplay he wrote alongside Joe Swanberg. It was released on July 24, 2020. In 2022, Franco featured in the main cast of the Apple TV+ mystery comedy series The Afterparty. The supernatural body horror film Together, which premiered at the 2025 Sundance Film Festival, featured Franco and his wife, Alison Brie, in the leading roles.

== Personal life ==
Franco with his wife Alison Brie at 2025 Sundance Film Festival

Franco began dating actress Alison Brie in 2012. In August 2015, the couple was engaged. On March 13, 2017, representatives for the couple confirmed that they had married in a private ceremony. Franco is Jewish.

== Filmography ==
=== Film ===
Year	Title	Role	Notes	Ref.
2007	Superbad	Greg the Soccer Player		
2007	After Sex	Sam		
2008	Milk	Telephone Tree #5		
2009	The Shortcut	Mark		
2009	A Fuchsia Elephant	Michael	Short; also executive producer	
2010	Greenberg	Rich		
2010	Charlie St. Cloud	Sully		
2011	The Broken Tower	Young Hart Crane		
2011	Fright Night	Mark		
2012	Would You	Dave	Short; also writer	
2012	21 Jump Street	Eric Molson		
2013	Warm Bodies	Perry Kelvin		
2013	Now You See Me	Jack Wilder		
2014	The Lego Movie	Wally	Voice Cameo	
2014	Neighbors	Pete Regazolli		
2014	22 Jump Street	Eric Molson	Uncredited cameo	
2015	Unfinished Business	Mike Pancake		
2016	Neighbors 2: Sorority Rising	Pete Regazolli		
2016	Now You See Me 2	Jack Wilder		
2016	Popstar: Never Stop Never Stopping	Co-actor in the movie "Cube Theorem"	Uncredited cameo	
2016	Nerve	Ian		
2017	The Little Hours	Massetto		
2017	The Disaster Artist	Greg Sestero		
2017	The Lego Ninjago Movie	Lloyd Garmadon	Voice	
2018	6 Balloons	Seth		
2018	If Beale Street Could Talk	Levy		
2019	Zeroville	Montgomery Clift		
2019	6 Underground	David / Six (The Driver)		
2020	The Rental	—N/a	Producer, writer and director	
2021	Zola	—N/a	Producer	
2022	Day Shift	Seth		
2023	Somebody I Used to Know	—N/a	Writer and director	
2024	Love Lies Bleeding	JJ Langston		
2025	Bubble & Squeak	Norman		
2025	Together	Tim Brassington	Also producer	
2025	Regretting You	Jonah Sullivan	Also executive producer	
2025	Now You See Me: Now You Don't	Jack Wilder		
2026	Idiots	Mark	Also producer	
2026	Hoppers	Titus (Insect King)	Voice	
2026	Forgotten Island	Raww	Voice	

=== Television ===
Year	Title	Role	Notes	Ref.
2006	7th Heaven	Benjamin Bainsworth	Episode: "Highway to Cell"	
2008	Do Not Disturb	Gus	5 episodes	
2008	Greek	Brad “Gonzo”	6 episodes	
2008–2009	Privileged	Zachary	5 episodes	
2009–2010	Scrubs	Cole Aaronson	13 episodes	
2011–2012	Young Justice	Edward Nigma / Riddler (voice)	Episodes: "Terrors" and "Usual Suspects"	
2015	Other Space	Chad Simpson	Episodes: "Into the Great Beyond... Beyond" and "Getting to Know You"	
2016	BoJack Horseman	Alexi Brosepheno (voice)	Episode: "Love And/Or Marriage"	
2016–2017, 2019	Easy	Jeff	4 episodes	
2018	Little Big Awesome	Dave (voice)	Episode: "Bed Follows/Gotta Get a Gimmick"	
2021	The Now	Ed Poole	14 episodes	
2022	The Afterparty	Xavier	7 episodes	
2022	Pam & Tommy	—N/a	Executive producer only	
2023–2025	Krapopolis	Broseidon (voice)	7 episodes	
2025	The Studio	Himself	3 episodes	
2025	Long Story Short	Danny Wegbriet (voice)	5 episodes	

=== Music videos ===
Year	Title	Artist(s)	Role	Ref.
2022	"Bud (Mowing Down Vamps)"	Jamie Foxx featuring Dave Franco, J Young MDK & Sam Pounds	Seth	
2022	"Bud (Remix)"	Jamie Foxx featuring Dave Franco, J Young MDK, Sam Pounds and Snoop Dogg	Seth	
2026	"Do Me Right"	Mr. Fantasy	Himself	

=== Video games ===
Year	Title	Voice role	Ref.
2016	Marvel Avengers Academy	Tony Stark / Iron Man	

=== Web ===
Year	Title	Role	Notes	Ref.
2011	You're So Hot	Himself	Funny or Die short; also writer	
2011	Go F*ck Yourself	Himself	Funny or Die short; also writer	
2012	You're So Hot: Part Deux	Himself	Funny or Die short; also writer	
2013	Dream Girl	Himself	Funny or Die short; also writer and director	
2013	Real Life H-O-R-S-E!	Himself	Funny or Die short; also writer	
2013	Chris & Daves Epic Adventure	Himself	Funny or Die series	
2014	Hazing	Himself	Funny or Die short	
2014	You're So Hot: Vol. 3	Beatrix Kiddo	Funny or Die short	
2015	Madden: The Movie	Blade Johnson	Madden NFL 16 promotional short	

== Awards and nominations ==
Association	Year	Category	Work	Result	Ref(s)
Independent Spirit Awards	2022	Best Film	Zola	Nominated	
MTV Movie & TV Awards	2015	Best On-Screen Duo (shared with Zac Efron)	Neighbors	Won	
Primetime Emmy Awards	2022	Outstanding Limited or Anthology Series	Pam & Tommy	Nominated	
Primetime Emmy Awards	2025	Outstanding Guest Actor in a Comedy Series	The Studio (episode: "CinemaCon")	Nominated	
