= Katie J. Stone =

American actress and writer (born 1986)

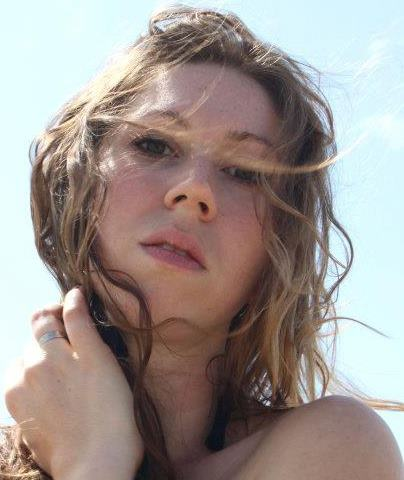
- Born: 1986 (age 39–40); Taipei, Taiwan
- Other name: Katie Johnson
- Occupations: writer, fine art model, actress
- Years active: 2007–present
- Spouse: Nick Stone (2019-present)

Katie J. Stone (born 1986 in Taipei, Taiwan) is an American actress and writer best known for her work on Shooter (2016–2018). She began her career as fine art model for photographer David LaChapelle.

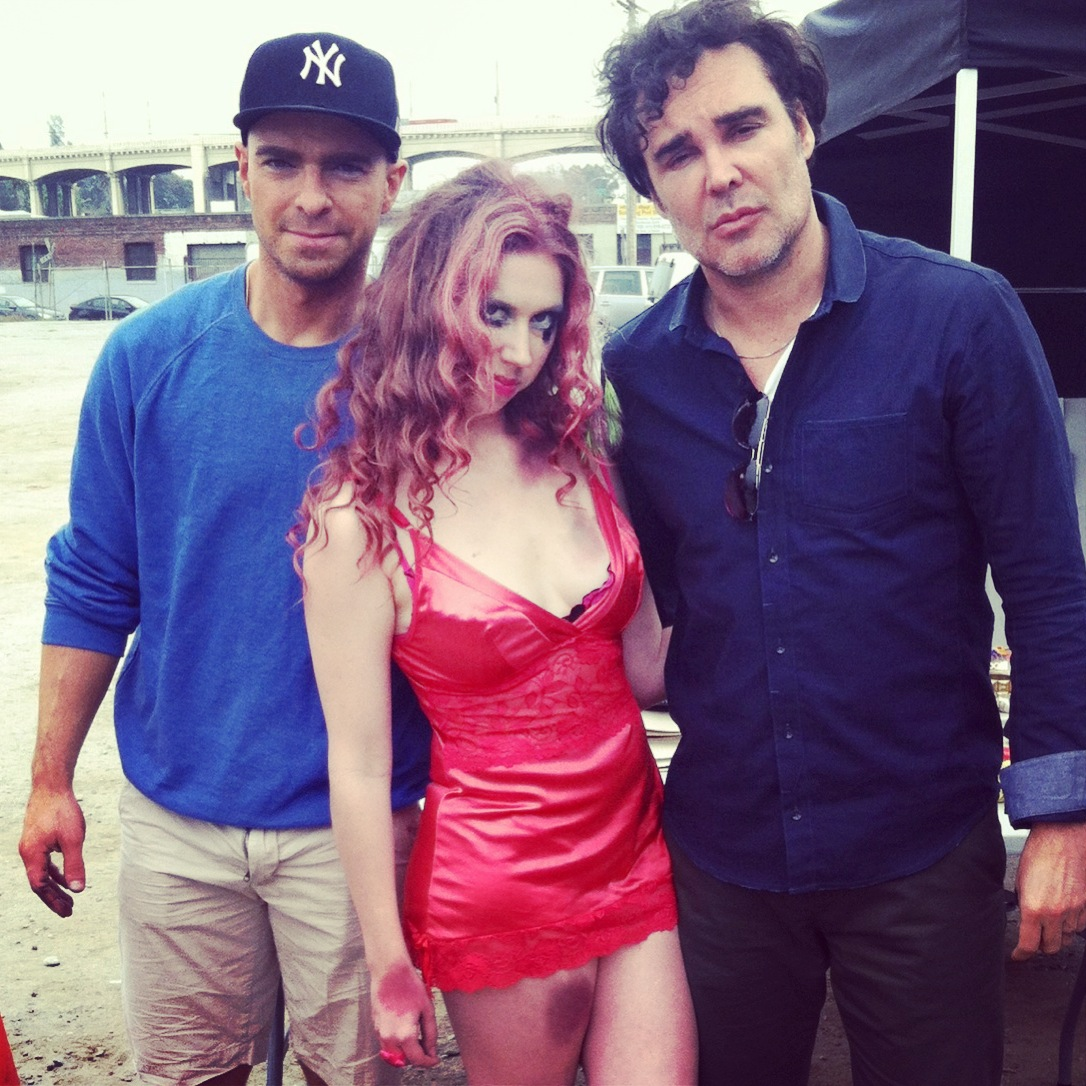
John Byrne, Katie Johnson, and David LaChapelle on set during the filming of "The Exorsocks", 2013

LaChapelle's first photograph to include Johnson, a group shot with other models, The Deluge, was used on the cover of French art photography magazine Photo Magazine in 2007. Stone also modeled for LaChapelle's fine art projects Auguries of Innocence, Bliss Amongst Chaos, Awakened, and The Raft, which was shot on location at LaChapelle's sustainable living ranch in Hana-Maui, Hawaii. LaChapelle cast Stone as the star of his "anti-commercial" ten-minute long art film and international campaign for Swedish brand Happy Socks, Happy Accidents: The Exorsocks, and is seen on select bottles Castellare di Castellina red wine.

Stone also was the model for photographer Brooke Shaden's "The Re-Imaging of Ophelia" series of images, one of which was used as cover art for Dot Hutchison's young adult novel "A Wounded Name". Stone was a nominee for the Shorty Awards "Best Actress" 2014, and is a contributing author with CreativeLIVE. She plays Becky in 5-Second Films "Dude Bro Party Massacre III" which was called, "Extremely well-made. The film's pacing, comedic timing, and sense of visual comedy are some of the best I've seen in a comedy this century." She volunteers her time and image with Pin-ups for Vets, a non-profit where models dress as World War II-style pin-up girls to raise funds for wounded veterans and deployed troops. She danced professionally with Vaud and the Villains, where she met her husband, drummer and classical percussionist, Nick Stone. She also performs regularly in Los Angeles under her burlesque soloist stage name, Miss Katy Bunny.

Stone is writing partners with David Daitch, together they have developed television dramas for Sony, ABC and FOX. In 2020 they started their own production company, Daitch & Stone Distillery. In 2021 she and Daitch became part of the creative team for Splinter Cell: Deathwatch, which "tied with The Hunt for Red October at 88% as the highest-rated Tom Clancy adaptation ever."

== Filmography ==
Year	Title	Role	Notes
2010	Look in the Mirror	Amanda	—N/a
2010	Crime Screen to Cold Hit	Detective Natalie Bradford	CBS Television Studios-produced LAPD short training film
2012	Project 12	Linda	—N/a
2013	Happy Accidents: The Exorsocks	The Dancer	Short
2014	Look in the Mirror	Amanda	
2015	Dude Bro Party Massacre III	Becky	—N/a
2015	Why I Dance	Herself	
2017	Hum	Burlesque Dancer	
2020	Claude	Katie	
2022	My Favorite Girlfriend	Melinda	

== TV series/internet productions ==
Year	Title	Role	Notes
2008–09	The Girls Next Door	Herself	2 episodes: "Fangs for the Mammaries", "Scream Test"
2009	The Wizards of Waverly Place	Model	1 episode: "Fashion Week"
2009	Science of the Movies	Herself	1 episode: "Crafting an Action Hero"
2009–10	CSI: Crime Scene Investigation	Cheerleader, Women in the Red Dress	2 episodes: "Blood Sport", "Sin City Blue"
2010	Greek	Spring Breaker	2 episodes: "All Children... Grow Up", "The First Last"
2011	Glee	Dancer	1 episode: "Blame it on the Alcohol"
2013	Adult Sorority: SuperFriends	Kate	YouTube Web series / all episodes
2013	Stage to Screen: Classics on Camera	Hedda Gabler	Anthology Web series / guest star
2015	Honest Monster	Katie	Anthology Web series / Guest star
2016	Call of Duty: Modern Warfare Remastered	Writer, additional dialogue	
2016-18	Shooter	Sarah Beckett	Recurring
2016-18	Shooter	Staff Writer	1 episode written by: "Patron Saint"
2022	Tom Clancy's Jack Ryan	Comms Officer LTJG Penny Strib	1 episode: "Star on the Wall"
2025–Present	Splinter Cell: Deathwatch	Writer, Story Editor	3 episodes written by, "Dinner First, Talk Later", " Welcome to 4th Echelon", "Scars of Bagram"
