= 5-Second Films =

American film group

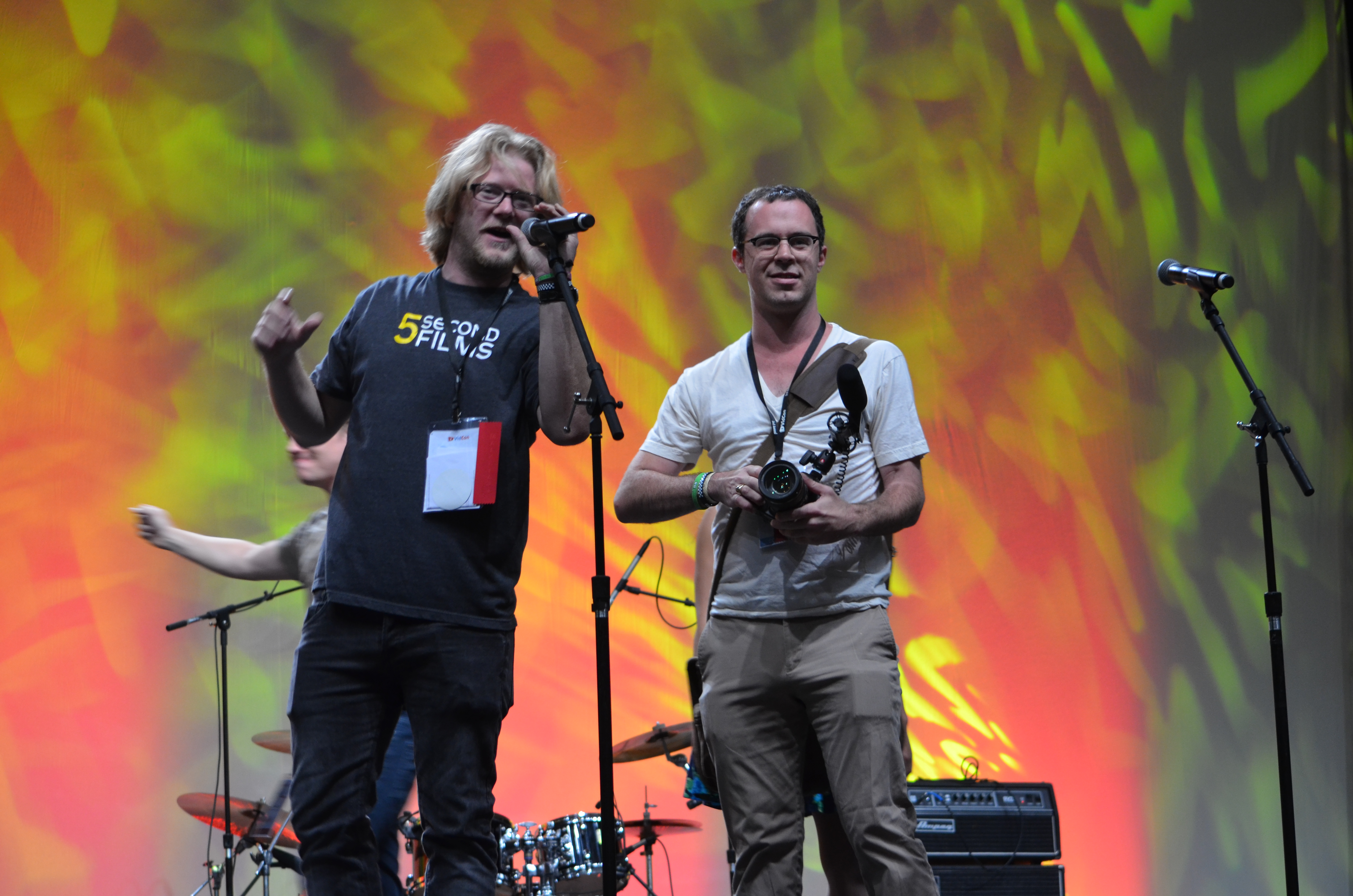
- Michael Rousselet and Michael Peter, two actors of 5SF, at VidCon 2012
- Abbreviation: 5SF
- Formation: 31 October 2008; 17 years ago
- Founder: Brian Firenzi
- Type: Film group
- Website: 5secondfilms.com

5-Second Films, 5 Second Films, or simply 5SF is an American film group and website that develops and produces an online comedy web series of five-second long short films, as well as a series of long films that have been viewed over 500 million times on YouTube. It was started in the dormitories at the University of Southern California in the spring of 2005 by Brian Firenzi. The website went live in October 2008. Up until December 2013, they featured a new film every weekday, with the only rules being two seconds of opening titles, five seconds of film consisting of a quick set-up and punchline, and one second of end titles. Currently, films are being released non-regularly.

The website has been featured on G4's Attack of the Show!, Comedy Central's Tosh.0, Last Call with Carson Daly, Spin, CNN Entertainment Weekly and Wired. The films sometimes featured guest stars like Patton Oswalt, Fred Armisen, Doug Benson, Eddie Pepitone, Juliette Lewis, "Weird Al" Yankovic, Andrew W.K. and Jack Quaid. Time put 5-Second Films on its list of the top 50 websites of 2013, calling it "addicting" and writing, "You'll probably never find a better way to waste a few seconds of your life."

== History ==
5SF was founded in 2005 by Brian Firenzi while he attended USC. The idea originally came from a contest organized by the Cadillac Motor Company, where five second commercials were allowed to be submitted for cars. Firenzi and friends never entered the contest. It inspired them to create "Chivalry is Dead," a five-second film where a man refuses to hold a door for a woman. Firenzi showed various other students his films, and several other creators joined him. The website, with its promise for a film every week day, was launched on October 31, 2008. More actors, writers and directors assembled in one house in Silver Lake, Los Angeles.

In February 2013, the core 5SF crew collaborated with Uproxx, releasing weekly sketches that were longer than five seconds. Usually these sketches were about three minutes.

=== Dude Bro Party Massacre III ===
Dude Bro Party Massacre III, created in 2009, was a parody of 1980s slasher films, changing the victims of the killer to men, instead of women. The next year, the idea returned to the cast, who made it into a fake trailer. In May 2013, the cast launched a Kickstarter to make Dude Bro Party Massacre into a feature-length film. By July of that year, the Kickstarter raised over $240,000. Producer Keith Calder of Snoot Entertainment matched the Kickstarter money, putting the budget for the film close to $500,000. Production began in January 2014 in Los Angeles and Big Bear, CA, and included performances from frequent 5SF guest stars Patton Oswalt, Andrew W.K., Greg Sestero from the cult film The Room, and Larry King. Production wrapped on June 23, 2014, and Dude Bro Party Massacre III made its world premiere at the Los Angeles Film Festival in June 2015. Bloody Disgusting called it "hysterical", IndieWire called it an "Instant Cult Classic", and Ain't It Cool News praised DBPM3 for its "murderously great horror satire".

== Members ==
5-Second Films is made up of a group of writers, directors, filmmakers, actors, and actresses, most of whom lived in the same house where they plan and film the shorts.

- Brian Firenzi, founder
- Joey Scoma
- Tim Ciancio
- Maria del Carmen
- Olivia Taylor Dudley
- Ben Gigli
- Kelsey Gunn
- Daniel K. Hollister
- Tomm Jacobsen
- Mike James
- Alec Owen
- Michael E. Peter
- Paul Prado
- Michael Rousselet
- Jon Salmon
- Erik Sandoval
- Jon Worley
- Zoran Gvojic
