= Infrared (film) =

- Directed by: Robert Livings; Randy Nundlall Jr.
- Written by: Robert Livings; Randy Nundlall Jr.
- Produced by: Travis Ayers; Robert Livings; Randy Nundlall Jr.
- Starring: Greg Sestero; Jesse Janzen; Leah Finity
- Cinematography: Robert Livings
- Edited by: Randy Nundlall Jr.
- Production companies: Sestero Pictures; Woof Cat Films
- Release date: March 3, 2022
- Running time: 88 minutes
- Country: United States
- Language: English

Infrared is a 2022 American found footage horror film that was written and directed by Robert Livings and Randy Nundlall Jr., both of whom also starred. The movie was released on July 22, 2022 and centers upon a television production crew investigating a purportedly haunted school for a television show pilot.

== Plot ==
The film opens with a title card stating that the movie's footage was taken from two cameras that were found during the demolition of Lincoln School in Sacramento, California. The first camera's footage shows a young woman placing hidden cameras throughout the school before she is attacked offscreen by an unseen assailant. The second camera contains footage taken during the filming of the pilot episode of the ghost hunting show Infrared. The school was chosen as the filming site due to rumors that it is haunted by the spirits of several people who died due to a gas leak in the basement. Lincoln School was closed down shortly thereafter and access was forbidden, leading to it becoming a desirable location for paranormal investigation. The footage primarily focuses on the show's hosts, Wes and his psychic sister Izzy, who had become estranged ever since a man died during one of Wes's exorcisms.

The film crew is let into the building by Geoff, a former educator for the school who now owns and maintains the premises. Soon after entering, Izzy begins to sense that something is truly wrong with the building. They begin to experience some strange phenomena and eventually come to discover the hidden cameras. Checking the footage reveals that the woman was knocked unconscious and carried off by Geoff. Izzy immediately wants to leave and turn the footage over to the police, however Wes convinces her to stay in order to put the spirits to rest. They eventually make their way down into the basement where the paranormal events begin to escalate. The psychic imprint of trauma causes Izzy extreme distress. The film crew does capture footage of a ghostly woman, who promptly attacks them. They move to leave, but are blocked by Geoff who reveals that the woman is his dead wife. He then begins to complain that the crew is doing a terrible job of filming the paranormal. He captures the crew and forces them back into the basement with the ghost, who attacks and presumably kills Wes, Izzy, and the crew.

== Cast ==
- Greg Sestero as Geoff
- Jesse Janzen as Wes
- Leah Finity as Izzy
- Ariel Ryan as Jane
- Samantha Laurenti as Sarah
- Nicole Berry as Catherine
- Ian Hopps as Ian
- Randy Nundlall Jr. as Randy
- Austin Blank as Austin
- Robert Livings as Rob
- Romulo Reyes as Jay
- Lori Richardson as Judy

== Development ==
The directors began planning a horror film after completing their movie The Other Girl, deciding that they wanted to allow actors to improvise their lines. They wrote out an outline for how they wanted the film to progress, but no dialogue. The filming location was chosen as the school had been abandoned since approximately 2010 and filming permits were obtained via Robert Livings's wife, who worked as a teacher and was able to find the relevant school district and officials necessary. Greg Sestero stated that the film appealed to him, as it reminded him of several bizarre people he met while living in a ranch in Arizona. He had begun planning some of his character and motivations prior to filming, which he kept secret from the others in order to maintain the element of surprise. The directors have commented that Infrared's casting choices were directly impacted by the covid-19 pandemic, as they chose to only bring on three actors for the main roles and have the production crew double as actors for the film. They experienced some difficulties because the filming location's availability was limited due to the lockdowns. FilmInk has described the lockdown "effectively had the production operating as a guerrilla unit" in order to complete the movie.

Of the film, Livings and Nundall Jr. noted that the movie was "first and foremost a horror film, but at its heart, is a movie about siblings reconnecting in a time of need."

== Release ==
Infrared screened at Luna Leederville in Perth, Western Australia on March 3, 2022, after which it released to streaming on July 22 of the same year.

== Reception ==
Infrared holds a rating of 50% on review aggregator Rotten Tomatoes, based on 8 reviews. John Townsend of Starburst wrote that Infrared was a "middling entry into an already overcrowded genre that, despite a couple of good moments, you’ll likely have forgotten about in no time." Alex Harrison of Screen Rant criticized the inclusion of an exorcism scene at the beginning of the movie and Sestero's acting, both of which they felt almost undercut what they saw as "an ultimately satisfying horror climax". Jim Morazzini panned the film in his review for Nerdly, commenting that the cinematography and location were good but that "the film’s tired script nullifies that. If they wanted to make an old-school found footage film they needed to emulate something like Grave Encounters and give the audience plenty to be scared of."
