= Young Engineers / Future Leaders =

Organization

- Abbreviation: YE/FL
- Formation: 2009
- Type: NGO
- Legal status: Active
- Headquarters: Paris, France
- Members: 23 Nations
- Head: Zainab Garashi; Chair of YE/FL
- Website: wfeo.net/YEFL

Logo of WFEO

Young Engineers/ Future Leaders is a Standing Committee of the World Federation of Engineering Organizations. Its membership includes engineering students and engineers are the start of their careers.

The current chair is Zainab Garashi from Kuwait. Vice Chair is Kathryn Johnson from United States and secretary is Christopher Chukwunta from Nigeria.

== Structure ==
The YE/FL is run by the YE/FL council. The YE/FL Council is the highest decision making board. Each national engineering association is asked to appoint one official delegate for the YE/FL Council. The Council meets at the regular committee meeting.

While absence of the YE/FL council the chair manages the main tasks, which are to guide the committee through its work, take care of administrative YE/FL responsibilities in between official meetings, to moderate official meetings, and set mile stones to help handle matters on time.

== History ==
The YE/FL was founded in 2009 during the WFEO Engineering Congress on alternative energy in Kuwait on 3–5 November 2009. The founding members are Zainab Garashi (Chair, Kuwait), Kathryn Johnson (Vice Chair, United States) and Felix Firsbach (Secretary, Germany). YE/FL met yearly during the WFEO conferences 2010 in Buenos Aires, Argentina, 2011 in Geneva, Switzerland and so on.

In 2017, YE/FL was reorganized with active directive from Tasiu Saad Gidari-Wudil, supervisor of the Engineering Regulation, Legislation and Liaison Board, to meet with WFEO‘s directives, engagement of government agencies and facilitation of collaborations.

In the early years, YE/FL struggled with inter-conference communication, which was mainly via email. Just after the COVID-19 outbreak communication became easier with upcoming video-conference software. Nowadays, YE/FL organizes internal online meetings, international competitions and was part of COP27.

== YE/FL represented nations ==
- Argentina
- Australia
- Bahrain
- Bangladesh
- Belize
- Brazil
- Costa Rica
- China
- Egypt
- Germany
- Honduras
- India
- Italy
- Kenya
- Kuwait
- Lebanon
- Nigeria
- Pakistan
- Peru
- Sierra Leone
- Singapore
- South Africa
- Switzerland
- Taiwan, China
- Tanzania
- UAE
- United States
- United States
- Zimbabwe
