= Cat Johnson =

American writer

Cat Johnson is a romance author. She has been a marketing manager, professional harpist, bartender, tour guide, and radio show host.

== Published works by publisher ==
=== Samhain Publishing ===
- Red, Hot & Blue series
- Red Blooded
- A Few Good Men
- Model Soldier
- A Prince Among Men
- Smalltown Heat
- Rough Stock
- Studs in Spurs series
- Unridden
- Bucked
- Ride
- Hooked
- Flanked
- Thrown

=== Kensington ===
==== Oklahoma Nights series ====
- One Night with a Cowboy
- Two Times as Hot
- Three Weeks with a Bull Rider
- He's the One (anthology)
- In a Cowboy's Bed (anthology)

=== Ravenous Romance ===
- A Cowboy for Christmas
- Valentine Cowboys

=== All Romance eBooks ===
- Texas Two-Step
- Cowboy Shuffle
- The Naughty Billionaire's Virgin Fiancée

=== Tease ===
==== Loves Immortal Pantheon series ====
- Erato
- Eros’ Valentine
- Bacchanal
- Bliss

=== Cat Johnson ===
- Private Lies
- Olympus
- Opposites Attract
- Nice & Naughty
- Just Desserts
- BB Dalton (Red, Hot & Blue series)
- 8 Second Ride (Studs in Spurs series)
- The Rookie (Studs in Spurs series)
- New Orleans
- Educating Ansley
- The Ex Files
- Crossing the Line
- Cinderella Liberty
- Beneath the Surface
- Gillian's Island
- The Love Bundle
- Good Girls Gone Bad Bundle
- Cat Snips

=== Cleis Press ===
Published by Cleis Press.

- Cowboy Heat
- Cowboy Lust
