= Greg Sestero =

American actor and model (born 1978)

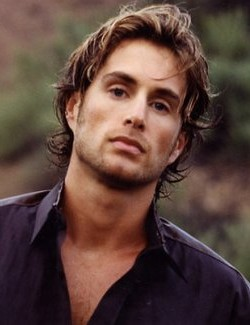
- Sestero in 2011
- Born: July 15, 1978 (age 48); Walnut Creek, California, U.S.
- Education: Monte Vista High School
- Occupations: Actor, model, author, filmmaker
- Years active: 1997–present
- Notable work: The Disaster Artist (book); The Room (film)
- Website: disaster-artist.com

Greg Sestero (born July 15, 1978) is an American actor, filmmaker, model and author. He is best known for his role as Mark in the 2003 cult film The Room, as well as for his well-received memoir The Disaster Artist, detailing his experiences making The Room, which was itself later adapted into a 2017 film.

== Early life ==
Sestero was born in Walnut Creek, California on July 15, 1978 to Marie-José (née Citro) and Richard Sestero. His father is American of Italian and Irish descent, and his mother is French from Grenoble, and is of French and Italian (Sicilian) heritage. He was raised in Danville, California, where he attended Monte Vista High School.

Sestero has said that he wrote a sequel to the then-recently released Home Alone at the age of 12, titled Home Alone 2: Lost in Disney World, which included a leading role for himself alongside Macaulay Culkin's Kevin McCallister. He submitted the screenplay, along with a provisional poster, soundtrack suggestions and a request for a cross-promotional deal between 20th Century Fox and Walt Disney Pictures, to Hughes Entertainment, and eventually received a commendatory letter from John Hughes. Sestero credits Hughes' gesture with inspiring him to pursue a professional acting career.

During his junior year of high school, Sestero began modeling, working in Milan and Paris for designers such as Giorgio Armani and Gianfranco Ferré. He returned to the United States to focus on acting, enrolling in the American Conservatory Theater in San Francisco. His signing with Hollywood agent Iris Burton prompted his eventual move to Los Angeles.

== Career ==
Sestero's early acting work included minor roles in the television show Nash Bridges and the films Gattaca (1997) and Patch Adams (1998). In 1999, Sestero was cast as the lead in the horror movie Retro Puppet Master. He followed this with a one-episode role on the television soap opera Days of Our Lives.

=== The Room ===
Sestero's best known role to date is as Mark, the best friend to Tommy Wiseau's character Johnny, in the 2003 cult film The Room. Sestero met Wiseau at an acting class in 1998 held by Jean Shelton. Wiseau told Sestero that if he was able to raise the funds to make the film, he would hire him as his co-star; Sestero arrived on set, only agreeing to work behind the scenes and help Wiseau with auditions and casting. However, Wiseau wanted the original actor cast as Mark out of the film, and formulated an elaborate plan to replace him with Sestero.

Sestero has said that he made the film assuming no one would see it and that it would go direct to video. The film was immediately lambasted by critics and fared very poorly at the box office. In Sestero's book, The Disaster Artist, he revealed that Wiseau had sent a copy of the film to Paramount Pictures to gain wide distribution and was denied by the studio within 24 hours (the typical response time is two weeks).

Ross Morin, an assistant professor of film studies at St. Cloud State University in Minnesota, called it "the Citizen Kane of bad movies", and Entertainment Weekly referred to Wiseau as "the Orson Welles of crap". Despite the poor showing, Sestero remained humorous and usually deflected much of the criticism of the film.

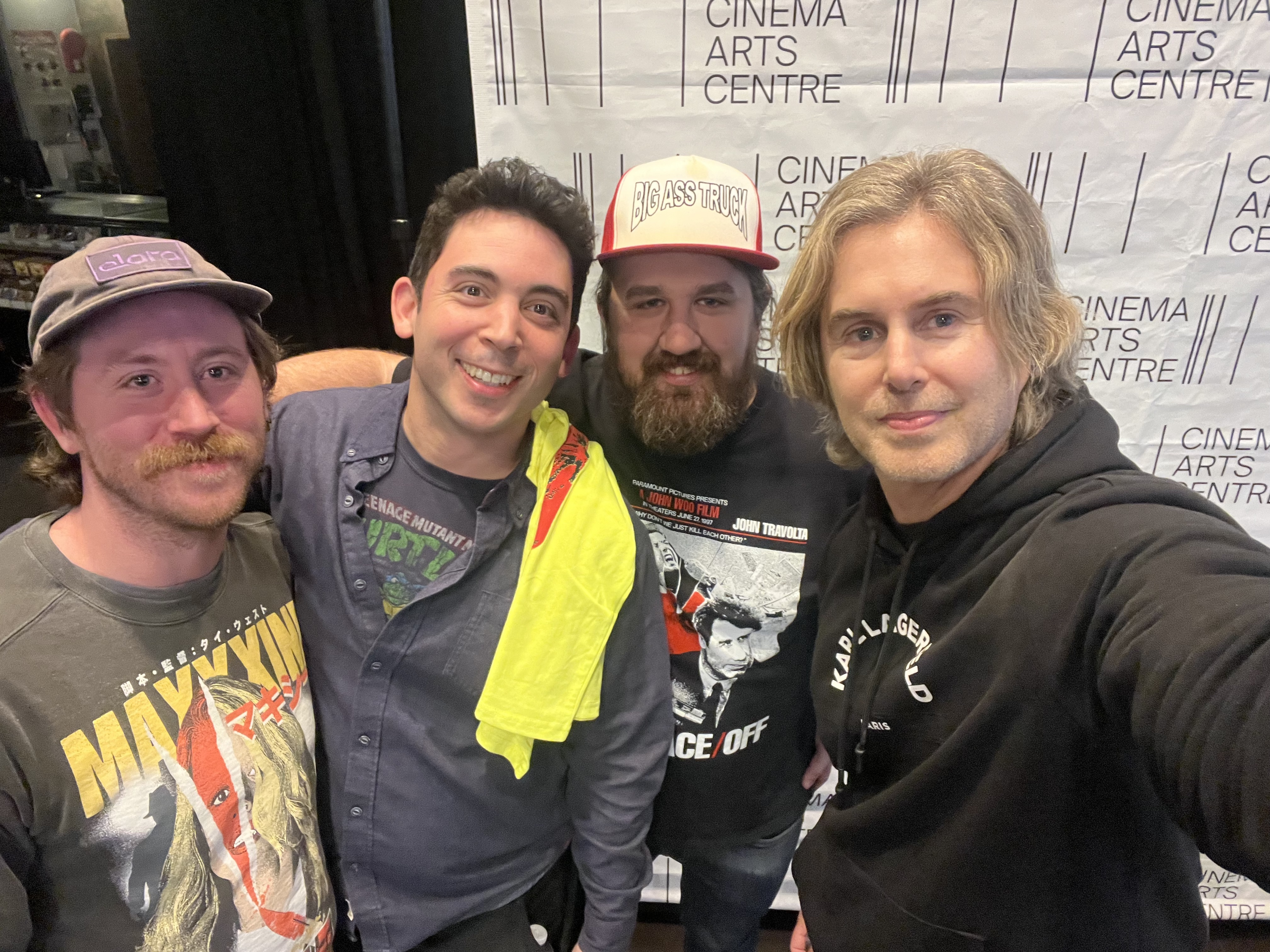
Sestero poses with fans during a screening of The Room in 2025

The film quickly began to receive attention from audience members because of its poor production values rather than in spite of them; it soon became a "cult classic" with late-night showings at theaters around the United States. Audience members typically arrive wearing wigs resembling their favorite characters, interact with the dialogue on screen, and throw plastic cutlery and footballs around the theater.

This attention grew into what was dubbed The Room's 2010–2011 "Love is Blind" International Tour, and the film was screened in the United Kingdom, Germany, Denmark, Australia, France, and India, among other locations. Sestero appeared at many of these events, posing for photographs with fans and often addressing them before the screenings.

Sestero appeared in a remake of The Room that was released in October 2025; originally, it was set for 2023, to coincide with the 20th anniversary of the original's release.

=== The Disaster Artist ===
In June 2011, it was announced that Sestero had signed a deal with Simon & Schuster to write a book based on his experiences making The Room with Tommy Wiseau. The book, titled The Disaster Artist, was released in October 2013.

On November 23, 2014, The Disaster Artist won Best Non-Fiction at the National Arts & Entertainment Journalism Awards ceremony in Los Angeles. The judges praised the book, stating "The Disaster Artist is not only a hell of a good read, it will make a great film if ever adapted. It's equal parts Ed Wood, American Hustle and demented Citizen Kane—with a dash of Monty Python thrown into the mix." On February 11, 2015, The Disaster Artist audiobook, narrated by Sestero, was nominated for Best Humor Audiobook at the 2015 Audie Awards.

In 2014, Seth Rogen's production company, Point Grey Pictures, acquired the rights to a film adaptation of Sestero's book. In the film, also titled The Disaster Artist, Dave Franco played Sestero, and James Franco starred as Wiseau and directed, for which he won a Golden Globe. Screenwriters Scott Neustadter and Michael H. Weber wrote the script. New Line Cinema produced the film, and distribution rights were later acquired by A24. Shooting began on December 8, 2015. The film premiered at South by Southwest on March 12, 2017 and began a wide theatrical release on December 8, 2017.

In December 2017, The Disaster Artist made its debut on the New York Times Bestseller List for Paperback Nonfiction.

=== Other works ===
In 2006, Sestero appeared in the television series Fashion House and had an uncredited role in Accepted. In 2010, he appeared in Miranda Lambert's music video "White Liar", which won the Country Music Television and the Academy of Country Music award for best video and song of the year; the video was also nominated for best video at the 2010 Country Music Association awards. Later that year, Sestero was featured in the 5-Second Film End Zone, directed by Michael Rousselet, one of The Room's original fans who helped propel the film to cult status.

Sestero starred with comedians Jason Saenz, Nick Turner, and Travis Irvine for a sketch comedy video in which Sestero turned into the "new" Jason Saenz via jaw surgery. The July 2010 edition of Diablo magazine labeled Sestero as one of the "Best of the East Bay Stars and Standouts."

In July 2011, Sestero teamed with comedian Patton Oswalt in You Got Mail, a 5-Second Film that features Oswalt as a mailman and Sestero waiting for his suspicious delivery.

On November 12, 2013, Sestero made a cameo appearance on an episode of the Nostalgia Critic internet review show, which had previously reviewed The Room, reprising his role of Mark. Sestero continues to model and has appeared in ads for Tommy Hilfiger, Armani, and Ralph Lauren, among others.

Sestero costarred in Dude Bro Party Massacre III (2015) from the creators of 5 Second Films. The film also stars Patton Oswalt and Andrew W.K. The film premiered at Los Angeles Film Festival on June 13, 2015.

Sestero teamed up with Wiseau again for the film Best F(r)iends (2018), written by Sestero, inspired by a road trip he took with Wiseau in 2003.

In October 2020, Sestero guest-starred as Jack, the fiancé in The Haunting of Bly Manor, the follow-up to Netflix's successful Haunting of Hill House. In 2020, he also starred in the horror comedy film Cyst, which premiered at FrightFest in 2020. He also wrote, directed, and starred in a cultist-themed horror film in early 2020, and in October 2020 said he was writing a UFO film in which he would star alongside Wiseau.

Sestero's directorial debut, Miracle Valley, premiered at Salem Horror Film Festival in October 2021. The film is about an obsessive photographer and his girlfriend who are invited to a desert getaway in search of an ultra-rare bird. There, their relationship is soon threatened by a sinister force, causing them to face demons from the past, present, and future.

== Personal life ==
Sestero lives in Southern California.

== Filmography ==
=== Film ===
Year	Title	Role	Notes
1997	Gattaca	Gattacan Citizen	Uncredited
1998	Patch Adams	Jaime	Uncredited
1999	Retro Puppet Master	Young André Toulon	
1999	EDtv	Roach	Uncredited
2003	The Room	Mark	Also line producer and Assistant to Mr. Wiseau
2004	Homeless in America	Himself	Documentary; Also executive producer and line producer
2006	Accepted	Frat Guy	Uncredited
2009	Alien Presence	Ash	
2009	The Pit and the Pendulum	Alicia's Boyfriend	
2015	Dude Bro Party Massacre III	Derek	
2017	The Disaster Artist	Casting Agent	Cameo
2017	Best F(r)iends	Jon Kortina	Also writer and producer
2019	Lukewarm Christian	Himself	Cameo
2020	Cyst	Bill	
2021	Miracle Valley	David	Also writer and director
2022	Infrared	Geoff	
2023	Enter the Drag Dragon	The Young Pirate	
2023	Big shark	Georgie	Credit only
2025	The Room Returns!	Chris-R	Remake of the 2003 film
TBA	Forbidden Sky		

=== Television ===
Year	Title	Role	Notes
2000	Days of Our Lives	Jules	1 episode
2006	Fashion House	Model	2 episodes
2013	The Blessed Ignorance of Men	Fr. Mark	Pilot
2020	The Haunting of Bly Manor	James	2 episodes

=== Web ===
Year	Title	Role	Notes
2011	How Did This Get Made?	Himself	Episode: "The Room: Director's Edition"
2013; 2018–2019	Nostalgia Critic	Mark, Himself, Tommy Wiseau	Episode: "Dawn of the Commercials", "The Most HATED Nutcracker Movie Ever Made", "Best F(r)iends"
2014	Shut Up and Talk	Himself	Talk show
2018	Nerdist Presents	Batman	"Tommy Wiseau's The Dark Knight"
2019	Rhonda: The Birth of a Queen	Himself	Cameo
2019	SpaceWorld	Drogol (voice)	
