= Shelton Studios =

American method acting school

Coordinates: 37.78906°N 122.40917°W

The Shelton Studios, also known as the Jean Shelton Actors Lab, is an American method acting school based in San Francisco. The school was founded in 1961 by stage actors Robert Elross and Jean Shelton. It prepares students to the art of film and theater acting by training human beings to be extraordinarily alive by developing a vivid imagination, an expressive body, an open heart, a searing intellect, and finally a desire to communicate what it means to be human in the world.

Students of the school have won Academy Awards, Emmy Awards, Tony Awards, and local awards.

== Alumni ==
Alumni of the Shelton Studios include: Rob Epstein, Nancy Kelly, Lourdes Portillo, Danny Glover, Wendy Phillips, Bill English, Howard Hesseman, J.E. Freeman, Anthony Cistaro, Peter Coyote, John Callahan, Laurie Walters, Tommy Wiseau, and Greg Sestero.

== Venues ==
- Shelton Theater: 533 Sutter St, San Francisco, CA 94102
