= List of 21st-century films considered the worst =

The films listed below have been ranked by a number of critics in varying media sources as being among the worst films made in the 21st century. Examples of such sources include Metacritic, Roger Ebert's list of most-hated films, Leonard Maltin's Movie Guide, Rotten Tomatoes, pop culture writer Nathan Rabin's My World of Flops, the Stinkers Bad Movie Awards, the cult TV series Mystery Science Theater 3000 (alongside spinoffs Cinematic Titanic, The Film Crew and RiffTrax), and the Golden Raspberry Awards (aka the "Razzies"). Films on these lists are generally feature-length films that are commercial or artistic in nature (intended to turn a profit, express personal statements or both), professionally or independently produced (as opposed to amateur productions, such as home movies), and released in theaters, then on home video. There are 46 films listed below, with 103 across both lists.

== 2000s ==
=== Freddy Got Fingered (2001) ===
The comedy film Freddy Got Fingered stars Tom Green, who also co-wrote and directed it, featuring largely gross-out and shock humor similar to that featured in The Tom Green Show. In the film, Green stars as a 28-year-old slacker and cartoonist who falsely accuses his father (played by Rip Torn) of child molestation when he questions his son's life goals. Freddy Got Fingered received overwhelmingly negative reviews, with CNN critic Paul Clinton declaring it "quite simply the worst movie ever released by a major studio in Hollywood history." Warren Epstein of The Gazette described Freddy Got Fingered as "the worst movie ever made". A review in The Washington Post said: "If ever a movie testified to the utter creative bankruptcy of the Hollywood film industry, it is the abomination known as Freddy Got Fingered." Roger Ebert included the film on his "most hated" list, gave it zero out of four stars and wrote: "This movie doesn't scrape the bottom of the barrel. This movie isn't the bottom of the barrel. This movie isn't below the bottom of the barrel. This movie doesn't deserve to be mentioned in the same sentence with barrels."

Freddy Got Fingered was nominated for eight awards at the 2001 Razzies, and won for Worst Picture, Worst Actor, Worst Director, Worst Screenplay, and Worst On-Screen Couple. Razzies founder John J. B. Wilson called it "offensive, stupid and obnoxious" and said it had "no redeeming value". Green accepted his awards in person, traveling to the ceremony in a white Cadillac, wearing a tuxedo and rolling out his own red carpet to the presentation. The movie has a 12% rating on Rotten Tomatoes, based on 99 reviews. In 2010, the film was nominated at the 30th Golden Raspberry Awards for Worst Picture of the Decade, though it lost to Battlefield Earth. Freddy Got Fingered also appeared on Metacritic's list of the all-time lowest-scoring films, was featured in Empire's list of the 50 Worst Movies Ever poll, and is on the MRQE's 50 Worst Movies list.The film has since garnered some positive critical re-evaluation, as well as a cult following.

=== Glitter (2001) ===
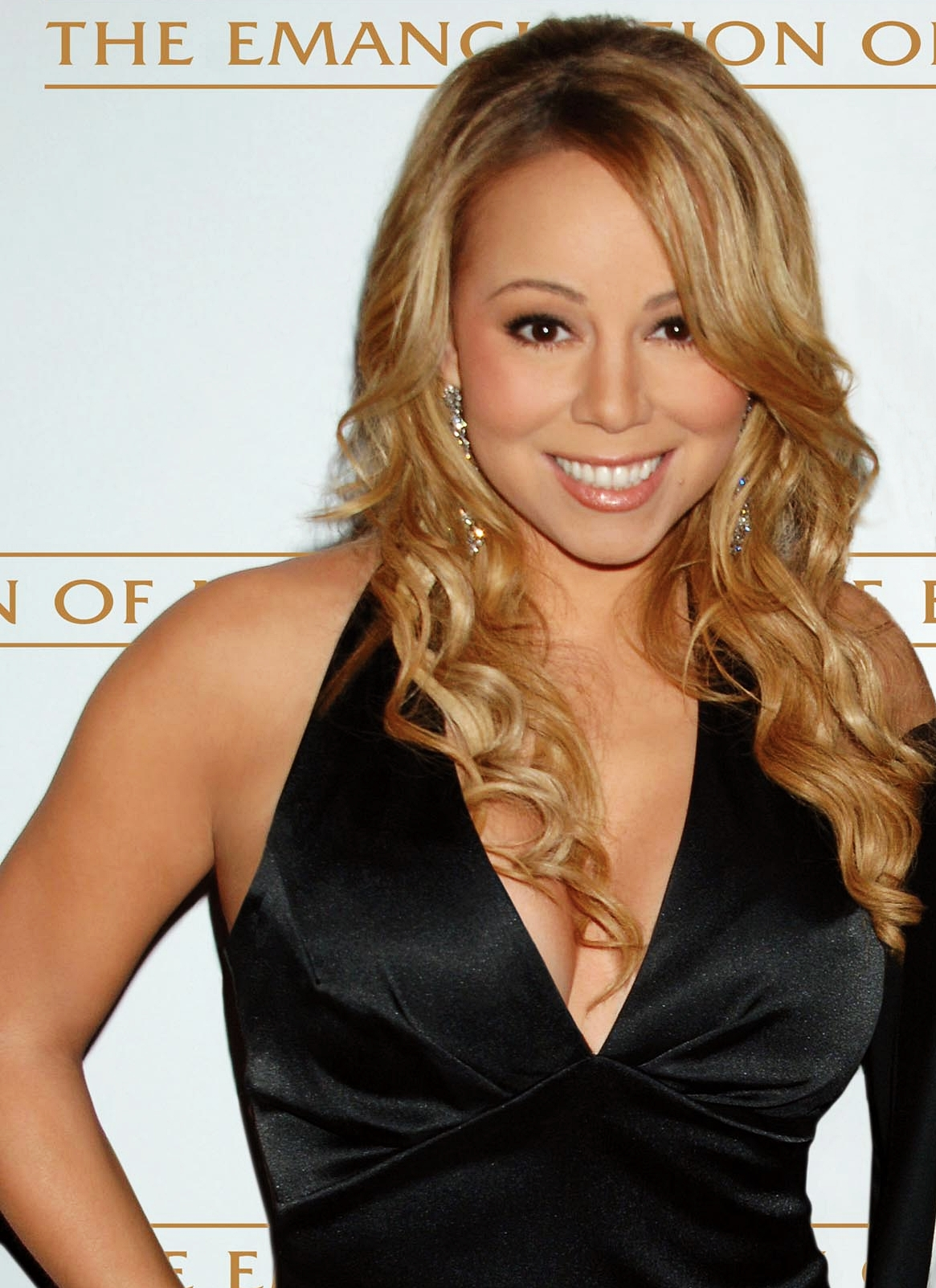
Carey (pictured) won a Golden Raspberry Award for Worst Actress for the film in 2001; she was consequently bought out of her $100 million recording contract with Virgin Records for approximately $28 million.

Starring Mariah Carey in the lead role as an aspiring singer in 1980s New York City, the romantic musical drama Glitter was intended to be her breakthrough role but was a critical failure and a box-office bomb. Hindustan Times claimed that Glitter "was slammed by almost all critics for being the worst film ever". Fade In stated that "Glitter isn't just one of the worst music-themed films ever – it's one of the worst films ever made, period." Author Bob McCann wrote in Encyclopedia of African American Actresses in Film and Television that it's "rightfully in the running as one of the worst films ever made". News.com.au, Hi, Flavorwire, Screen Rant, Vanity Fair, Metacritic, and Empire are amongst those who have listed it as one of the worst films ever made.

Glitter received six Razzie nominations, and Carey won for Worst Actress. It was also featured in The Official Razzie Movie Guide, and in 2005, it was nominated for "Worst Musical of Our First 25 Years", but lost to From Justin to Kelly. In an interview in 2010, Carey stated that she believed that the film's failure at the box office was largely due to the soundtrack being released the same day as the September 11 attacks. It has a 6% rating on Rotten Tomatoes based on 86 reviews.

=== Swept Away (2002) ===
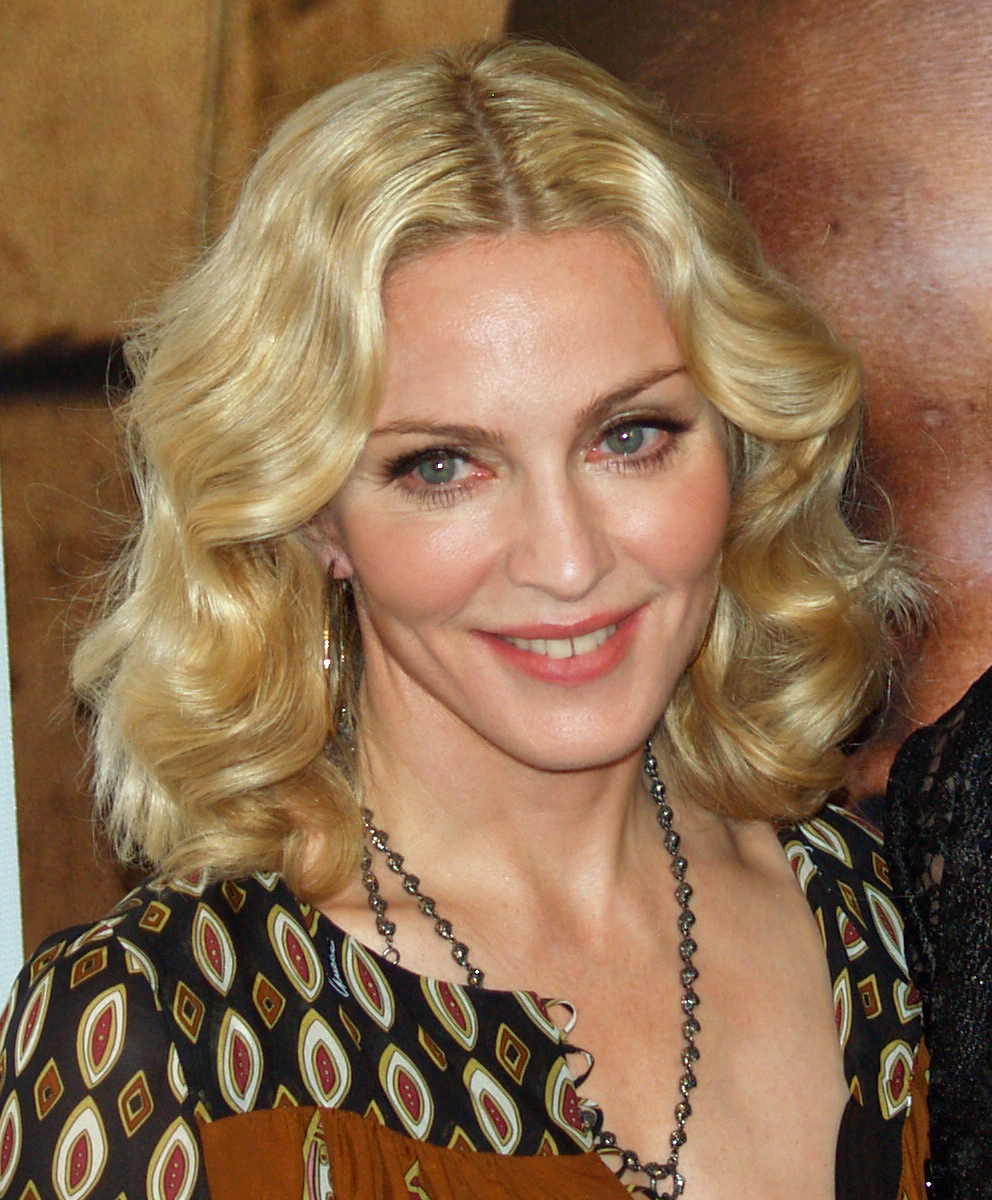
Madonna received a Golden Raspberry Award for her performance in the 2002 remake of Lina Wertmüller's Oscar-nominated Swept Away, making her the most awarded actress in the institution's history.

A remake of a 1974 Italian film of the same name, the romantic comedy film Swept Away was directed by Guy Ritchie and starred his then-wife Madonna and Adriano Giannini. It received overwhelmingly negative reviews, with most of the criticism going towards Madonna's bad acting, the original film being considered superior and the remake being considered just a star vehicle for Madonna. Rex Reed of The New York Observer said: "If there is one thing worse than a Guy Ritchie movie, it's a Guy Ritchie movie with Madonna in it." Newsday critic John Anderson said, "New ways of describing badness need to be invented to describe exactly how bad it is." Joe Queenan of The Guardian discussed the movie in an article on what makes a movie the worst of all time and said, "[...] Showgirls has a certain campy allure that grows a bit each time I see it. Madonna's Swept Away doesn't; it seems more amateurish on each viewing, like a morass that starts out as a quagmire, then morphs into a cesspool and finally turns into a slime pit on the road to its ultimate destination in the bowels of Hell." Julie Burchill, also from The Guardian, selected it as her pick for the worst film ever made.

Swept Away was also a box-office bomb; against a $10 million budget, it grossed $598,645 in the United States and around $437,875 from foreign territories for a worldwide total gross of $1,036,520. It received five awards at the 23rd Golden Raspberry Awards and became the first film to win both Worst Picture and Worst Remake or Sequel. At the 25th Golden Raspberry Awards, it was nominated for Worst "Drama" of Our First 25 Years, and at the 30th Golden Raspberry Awards, it was nominated for Worst Picture of the Decade, but 'lost' to Battlefield Earth at both ceremonies. Empire ranked it #20 in its list of "The 50 Worst Movies Ever", and AfterEllen ranked it #7 in its list of "The worst movies ever to grace the screen".

=== The Master of Disguise (2002) ===
The comedy film The Master of Disguise was produced in part by Adam Sandler and stars Dana Carvey as Pistachio Disguisey, an undercover Italian waiter who must save his father Fabbrizio (James Brolin) from the evil Devlin Bowman (Brent Spiner) by using his inherent skills in disguise. Although the film was a box office success, it received scathing reviews from critics upon its release, many of which pointed out its sophomoric plot, unfunny humor (in particular, its flatulence gags) and disguises that would clearly not be recognized by children (such as Tony Montana from Scarface). Many critics also pointed out the short running time, consisting of 72 minutes of the film itself and over ten minutes of end credits juxtaposed with outtakes, including two post-credit scenes. Roger Ebert gave it one star out of four, claiming, "The movie is a desperate miscalculation. It gives poor Dana Carvey nothing to do that is really funny, and then expects us to laugh because he acts so goofy all the time." Alan Morrison, writing for Empire, proclaimed that The Master of Disguise was "the worst film ever made: a film about idiots, made by idiots, for idiots", while Matthew Turner of ViewLondon remarked, "This is a serious contender for the title of The Worst Film Ever Made." The film holds a 1% rating on Rotten Tomatoes based on 105 reviews, and is featured on the site's list of the top 100 worst-reviewed films of all time. It also appears on Metacritic's list of the all-time lowest-scoring films, and is on the MRQE's 50 Worst Movies list. A cameo appearance by Bo Derek was nominated for Worst Supporting Actress at the 23rd Golden Raspberry Awards, but she lost to Madonna for Die Another Day.

=== Ballistic: Ecks vs. Sever (2002) ===
The action film Ballistic: Ecks vs. Sever stars Antonio Banderas and Lucy Liu as opposing secret agents. Critics panned the movie, generally regarding it as having no redeeming features, lacking even the unintentional comedic value normally associated with bad films. The critical consensus on Rotten Tomatoes describes the movie as "A startlingly inept film, Ballistic: Ecks vs. Sever offers overblown, wall-to-wall action without a hint of wit, coherence, style, or originality.".

Stephen Hunter of The Washington Post wrote, "You could run this film backward, soundtrack included, and it would make no less sense." Roger Ebert called the movie "a chaotic mess, overloaded with special effects and explosions, light on continuity, sanity and coherence." The movie was also a commercial failure, recouping just over $19.9 million of its $70 million budget. In March 2007, Rotten Tomatoes ranked it #1 among "The Worst of the Worst" movie list, with 108 "rotten" reviews and no "fresh" ones. Ballistic: Ecks vs. Sever remains the worst-reviewed film on Rotten Tomatoes, as it is at the top of their 100 Worst Films of All time list. Mental Floss has also nominated it as the worst movie ever made and Ebert included it in his "most hated" list.

Conversely, the movie's videogame adaptation and its 2002 sequel, both for the Game Boy Advance, received critical acclaim, being regarded by some critics as two of the console's better first-person shooter games.

=== Ben and Arthur (2002) ===
A low-budget 2002 American romantic drama film about the titular gay couple who come into conflict with Arthur's religious brother, Ben and Arthur was written, directed, produced, edited, and scored by Sam Mraovich, who also played the character Arthur. Ben and Arthur received strong criticism (especially from the LGBT community) for its low budget and poor plotting. BuzzFeed described it as the "worst gay movie of all time". The gay popular culture site Queerty described Ben and Arthur as "unintelligible" and ended its review by calling it the "Worst. Movie. Ever." The gay movie review site Cinemaqueer likewise stated: "Ben and Arthur is so terrible that it has awoken the dormant Bette Davis in me. It is so painfully bad that it wouldn't even make good fodder on Mystery Science Theater 3000. This just might possibly be the worst movie I have ever seen ... Unless you get a kick out of mocking bad films, avoid this one at all costs." Michael Adams, reviewing the film for his book Showgirls, Teen Wolves, and Astro Zombies, describes it thus: "Ben & Arthur is as over-the-top insane as it is ludicrously executed ... the production values, from biscuits on plates comprising the main course of a candlelit dinner to a church literally having a cardboard cross and a cartoon Jesus on the wall, are as bad as anything I've seen." A Rotten Tomatoes article placed Ben and Arthur on their list of "Films So Bad They're Unmissable", saying "If Tommy Wiseau's The Room is the over-wrought, melodramatic and self-pitying heterosexual camp classic of choice, then Sam Mraovich's Ben & Arthur is its gay equivalent." Rotten Tomatoes also stated "Every scene, every line, every hissy fit is simultaneously hilariously amateur and hysterically fever-pitched." Total Film ranked Ben and Arthur at No. 58 in their list of the 66 worst films of all time. Mraovich finds Ben and Arthur's placement among the canon of worst films to be a blessing as the film has received more attention than he ever anticipated.

=== From Justin to Kelly (2003) ===
The romantic-comedy musical From Justin to Kelly stars Kelly Clarkson and Justin Guarini, the winner and runner-up, respectively, of the first season of American Idol. The film was a critical and commercial disaster, earning only $4.9 million at the North American box office and achieving a 10% rating on Rotten Tomatoes based on 63 reviews. Josh Tyrangiel of Time Magazine described From Justin to Kelly as "a monstrous Idol movie musical that in the most generous light is the worst film so far this century", while The Free Lance–Star referred to it as "the world's worst movie". Nathan Rabin, reviewing the film for his "My Year of Flops" series, stated, "All films require suspension of disbelief. From Justin To Kelly requires something more like a temporary lobotomy. Nothing about the main characters or their relationships makes sense." It won a special Razzie—"Governor's Award – Distinguished Under-Achievement in Choreography"—at the 24th Golden Raspberry Awards. It was nominated for eight additional Razzies (including a second special award, "Worst Excuse for an Actual Movie"), and a year later it won for Worst "Musical" of Our First 25 Years. Total Film, Screen Rant and Digital Trends included From Justin to Kelly on their worst film lists. In a later interview, Clarkson expressed regret over From Justin to Kelly, stating she only did it because she was contractually obligated to do so: "I knew when I read the script it was going to be real, real bad, but when I won, I signed that piece of paper, and I could not get out of it."

=== The Room (2003) ===
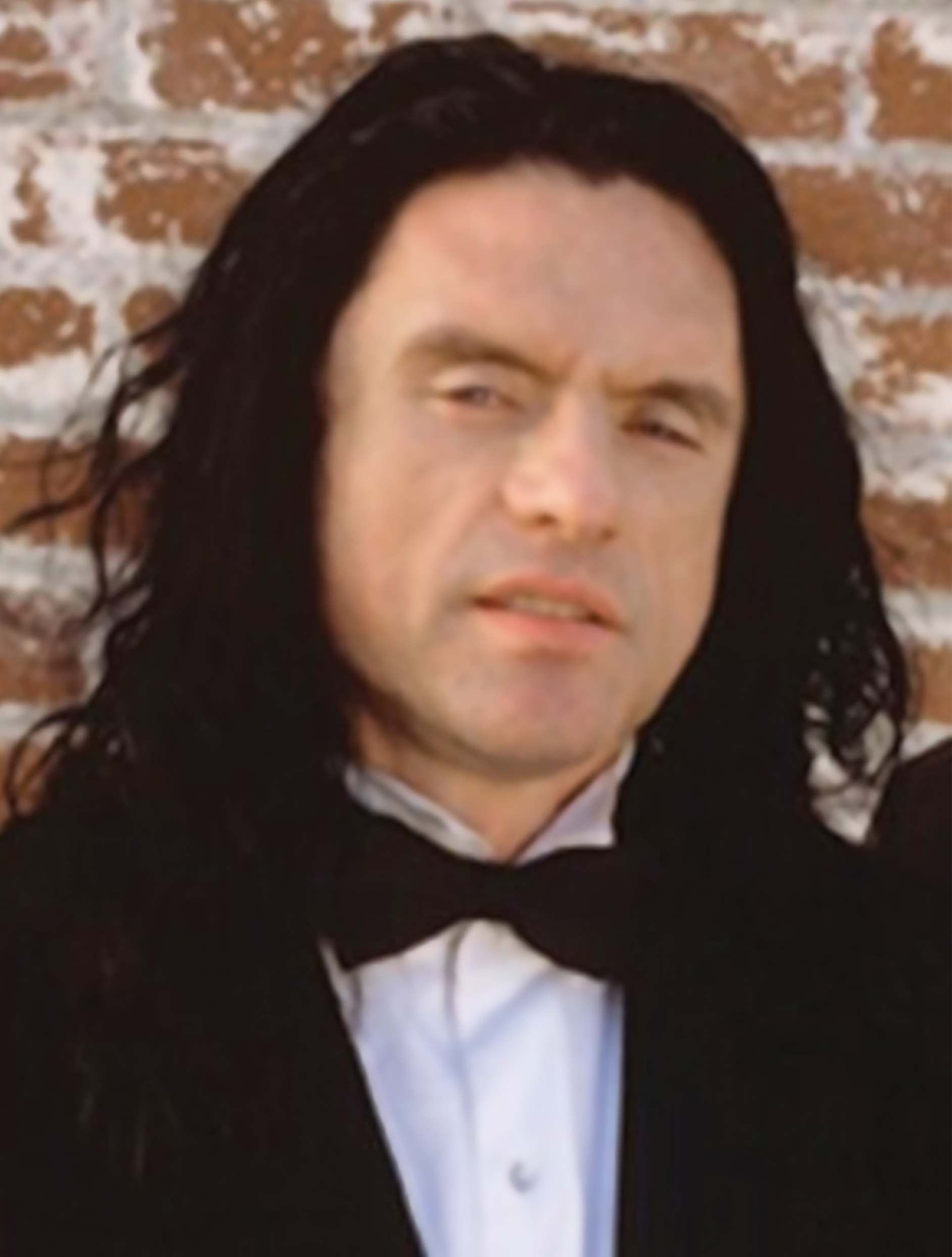
Tommy Wiseau in a promotional picture for the 2003 cult classic The Room

The independently produced cult film The Room, about an amiable banker whose friends betray him one by one, has been called "the Citizen Kane of bad movies" by some critics. The Guardian, Vox, The Washington Post, ABC Australia, and Süddeutsche Zeitung called it the worst film ever made. Ignatiy Vishnevetsky of The A.V. Club called it "the greatest bad movie of our time" and said, "The Room is nearly an anti-film—an inane and unintentionally surreal soap opera, filled with non-sequiturs, confused characters, and gratuitous, anatomically incorrect sex." Common criticisms include its misogynistic portrayal of women, bizarre dialogue and character behavior, amateurish set design, a meandering script that fails to resolve subplots or explain characters' motivations, obvious technical gaffes such as poor focus and badly executed green-screen, and star, writer, producer, and director Tommy Wiseau's over-the-top, heavily accented performance as the romantic lead. Wiseau has claimed it is a black comedy and its numerous flaws are intentional, but others involved in the production have denied this, saying that Wiseau intended it as a melodramatic romance.

The film's reputation for being "so-bad-it's-good" together with Wiseau's "friendly and infectiously upbeat [yet] incredibly secretive" attitude have fed the film's success as a video and midnight movie. During showings, dedicated fans mock technical errors and peculiar dialogue in certain scenes, and throw plastic spoons at the screen whenever a picture of a spoon in the main apartment set appears. The 2013 book The Disaster Artist, written by Greg Sestero and Tom Bissell, is Sestero's memoir of his involvement in the production. The book was adapted into the Oscar-nominated film of the same name, directed by and starring James Franco as Wiseau (winning a Best Actor Golden Globe Award for his performance).

=== Gigli (2003) ===
The Martin Brest movie Gigli features Jennifer Lopez and Ben Affleck, with appearances by Al Pacino and Christopher Walken. Gigli was originally a black comedy with no romantic subplot, but the producers demanded script rewrites throughout filming, hoping to cash in on the Lopez–Affleck romance that was then big news in celebrity-watching publications such as Us and People. This film cost $54 million to make but grossed only $6 million, making it one of the biggest box-office bombs of all time. The Times gave the film a zero, making Gigli the lowest-scored film review in the publication's history at that time. The Wall Street Journal stated that it was "[t]he worst movie—all right, the worst allegedly major movie—of our admittedly young century", while Roger Friedman of Fox News claimed it was "[t]he worst movie ever made". It was also the winner of seven Razzies (including 2005's Worst "Comedy" of Our First 25 Years), and in 2010 the film was nominated at the 30th Golden Raspberry Awards for "Worst Picture of the Decade". It is in Rotten Tomatoes' Top 100 worst-reviewed movies of the 2000s, where it has a 6% rating. AfterEllen ranked Gigli number 1 in its list of the worst films of all time. Empire, Screen Rant, and Digital Trends also listed it as one of the worst films ever made.

=== Sex Lives of the Potato Men (2004) ===
The 2004 British sex comedy Sex Lives of the Potato Men is about the sex lives of a group of potato delivery men in Birmingham. The film received strongly hostile reviews from the British media. Reviews claimed Sex Lives of the Potato Men was unfunny, disgusting, and depressing. Writing in the Daily Mirror, film critic Kevin O'Sullivan called Sex Lives of the Potato Men "one of the worst films ever made". Novelist Will Self, in his review for The Evening Standard, called Sex Lives of the Potato Men "mirthless, worthless, toothless, useless". The Times reviewer James Christopher dubbed Sex Lives of the Potato Men "one of the two most nauseous films ever made ... a masterclass in film-making ineptitude". The Sunday Express film critic, Henry Fitzherbert, also strongly condemned the film: "Sex Lives is so awful it left me slack-jawed in disbelief ... it must be one of the worst British comedies." Catherine Shoard, in a critique in The Sunday Telegraph, stated "It's hard to know what to say to this – it's like finding the right words at a nasty accident ... Sex Lives of the Potato Men is probably the lewdest Brit-com since Confessions of a Window Cleaner, and certainly the worst." Shoard also described the film as "Less a film than an appetite suppressant." Alan Morrison in the Scottish Daily Record described it as "puerile smut of the very worst kind ... Sex Lives of the Potato Men should never have been made". The Irish Times later noted that "Sex Lives of the Potato Men attracted some of the worst reviews in living memory." The Birmingham Post described Sex Lives of the Potato Men as "quite possibly the worst film ever made", while The Independent on Sunday stated that the film was "a strong contender for the title of worst film of all time". It was also featured in Empire's 50 Worst Movies Ever poll. The film has a 0% rating on Rotten Tomatoes, based on 14 reviews.

=== Catwoman (2004) ===
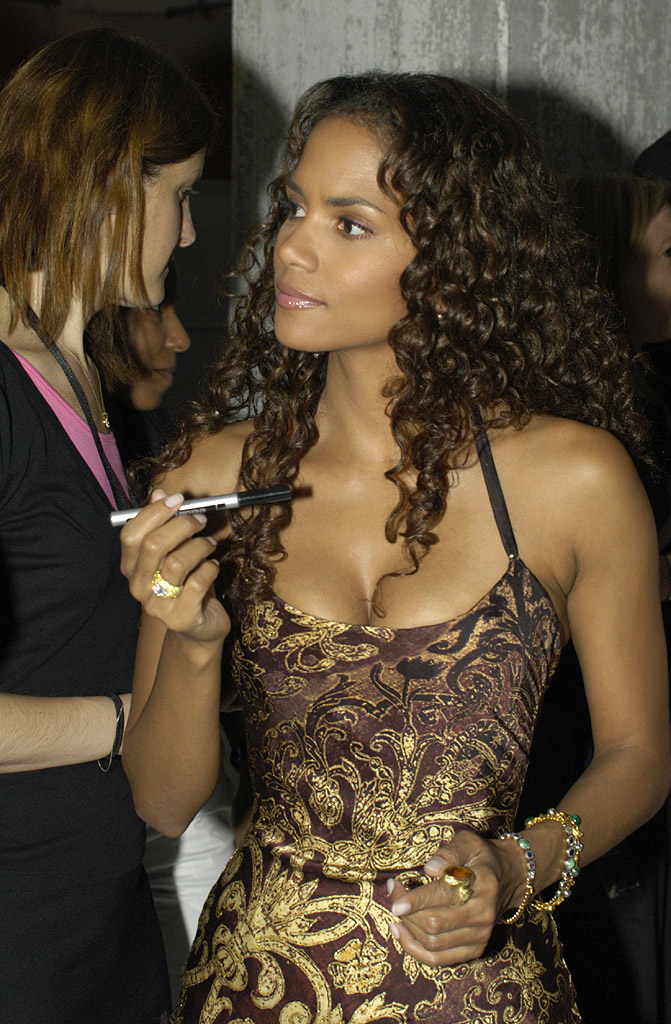
Halle Berry at the Catwoman premiere in Hamburg, Germany. Berry would accept the Golden Raspberry Award for Worst Actress for her performance in person where she described the film as a "piece of shit, godawful movie".

Nominally based on the DC Comics character, Catwoman stars Halle Berry as the title character. The film was the result of various rewrites by a total of 28 screenwriters, though only four were credited after arbitration with the Writers Guild of America. It has an 8% rating at Rotten Tomatoes, and was declared "arguably the worst superhero film ever made" by the Orlando Sentinel. Jean Lowerison of the San Diego Metropolitan said in her review that Catwoman "goes on my 'worst' list for the year, and quite possibly for all time". Sadaf Ahsan of the National Post went further, calling it the worst movie ever made. The Village Voice summed up reviews of the film under the title "Me-Ouch". The movie was the winner of four Razzies for Worst Picture, Worst Actress, Worst Director (Pitof) and Worst Screenplay. Berry arrived at the ceremony to accept her Razzie in person (with her Best Actress Oscar for Monster's Ball in hand), saying: "First of all, I want to thank Warner Bros. Thank you for putting me in a piece of shit, god-awful movie ... It was just what my career needed." Roger Ebert included it in his "most hated" list, being joined by Screen Rant and Flavorwire, who also included it in their worst film lists.

=== Daniel – Der Zauberer (Daniel – The Wizard) (2004) ===
The German film Daniel – Der Zauberer was directed by Ulli Lommel and stars pop singer and ex-Deutschland sucht den Superstar contestant Daniel Küblböck, who appeared as a fictionalized version of himself. The Daily Dot wrote that it is considered to be the worst German film, while n-tv said it was "possibly the worst movie ever made". A film critic on Zukunftia states "The cameraman [...] also did a thorough job of testing my tolerance for suffering: The camcorder wobbled and trembled at peculiar angles, making me feel like I was back in the second half of the movie "Titanic"." The website filmstarts.de states that Daniel – Der Zauberer was "unbearable for non-fans of Küblböck", adding that "the performances of the actors were some of the worst in the history of German cinema", and opining that Ulli Lommel and producer Peter Schamoni had "damaged their reputation". Years after its release, Küblböck admitted that, in retrospect, "[Y]ou have to say this is the worst movie of all time really".

The film also performed extremely poorly at the box office, having only 13,834 viewers altogether, which led to it being withdrawn from screening at most cinemas within the first week, with RP Online referring to it as a "super-flop". It is consistently listed at IMDb's Bottom 100 list and became the lowest-rated film at one point. Total Film listed it as the third worst film of all time, after Superbabies: Baby Geniuses 2 and the direct-to-video animated mockbuster Titanic: The Legend Goes On, while Fotogramas and New York Daily News included it on their worst film lists. Filmstarts.de ranked it number 4 in its list of the 25 worst movies ever made, and on the German movie rating site Moviepilot.de, it is the lowest-rated film with an average rating of 0.4/10. In 2016, it was showcased on SchleFaZ, a German television show featuring the worst films ever made.

=== Superbabies: Baby Geniuses 2 (2004) ===
The family-oriented comedy Superbabies: Baby Geniuses 2 was the last film directed by Bob Clark (of A Christmas Story fame) before his death. It is a sequel to the 1999 film Baby Geniuses and like its predecessor, it received negative reviews from film critics. Following the plot of the first film, four babies can communicate with each other using "baby talk", and have knowledge of many secrets. The "baby geniuses" become involved in a scheme by media mogul Bill Biscane (Jon Voight), a notorious kidnapper of children, who intends to use a satellite system to brainwash the world's population and force them to watch TV for the rest of their lives.

The film was a box-office bomb, only receiving $9 million from its $20 million budget. MovieWeb writer B. Alan Orange considers it the worst movie ever made, Entertainment Weekly writer Joshua Rivera stated that it was the worst movie he had ever sat through, and Tom Long of The Deseret News said "It is perhaps the most incompetent and least funny comic film ever made." It was nominated for four Golden Raspberry Awards including Worst Picture, Worst Director (Bob Clark), Worst Supporting Actor (Jon Voight) and Worst Screenplay (Steven Paul (story) & Gregory Poppen). Total Film named it the runner-up to Titanic: The Legend Goes On in its list of the worst films ever made, and Mental Floss selected it as the second worst movie ever made after Ballistic: Ecks vs. Sever. It was ranked as the worst sequel of all time by Rotten Tomatoes and, with a score of 0%, it is included in their list of the 100 Worst Movies of All Time.

=== Alone in the Dark (2005) ===
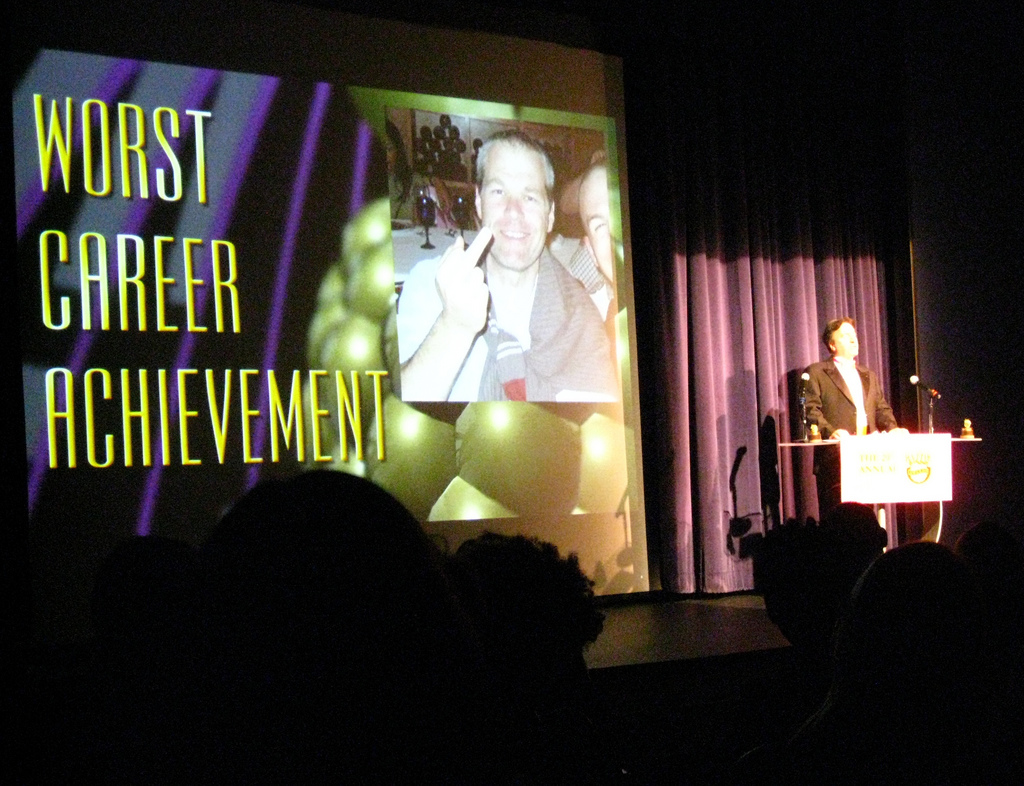
Alone in the Dark director Uwe Boll receiving a rare Worst Career Achievement award at the 29th Golden Raspberry Awards, where he was described as "Germany's answer to Ed Wood".

Loosely based on a series of video games by Infogrames and directed by Uwe Boll, the German-Canadian-American film Alone in the Dark was panned by critics for a multitude of reasons, including poor script and production values, quick cuts to optimize the gory content, almost no connection to the game, and bad acting. The movie received a 1% rating at Rotten Tomatoes, was the second worst reviewed movie of the 2000s, and appears in their top 100 worst-reviewed movies list. It appeared on Metacritic's list of the all-time lowest-scoring films, which they gave a 9/100 to, is on the MRQE's 50 Worst Movies list, and is one of the few films to have received an F rating on CinemaScore.

Roger Moore of The Orlando Sentinel stated: "Alone in the Dark shows just how tenuous Plan 9 from Outer Space's hold on that 'worst movie ever' title really is." Likewise, Peter Hartlaub, the San Francisco Chronicle's pop culture critic, called the film "the best Ed Wood movie ever made ... a film so mind-blowingly horrible that it teeters on the edge of cinematic immortality." In 2009, he named it the worst film of the decade. Jeffrey Lyles of The Gazette considered it so bad that "other legendary bad films ... await a film of this magnitude because it gets awfully lonely on the island of misfit movies", while Scott Nash of Three Movie Buffs dubbed it "one of the worst movies ever made."

Screenwriter Blair Erickson wrote about his experience dealing with Boll and his original script, which was closer to the actual game itself, and Boll's script change demands on the comedy website Something Awful. It received two 2005 Golden Raspberry Awards nominations for Worst Director (Uwe Boll) and Worst Actress (Tara Reid), and won three 2005 Stinkers Awards, for Worst Picture, Worst Director, and Worst Special Effects. Empire, Flavorwire, and Screen Rant all later included the film on their respective lists for the worst films ever made.

=== Aag (2007) ===
Aag is a remake of one of the most successful Hindi films, Sholay, directed by Ram Gopal Varma. Rajeev Masand gave it a zero out of five. Times of India stated that Aag "destroyed Bollywood's greatest film" and acknowledged that some "consider it the world's worst film". Hindustan Times awarded it the "Lifetime's Worst Ever Movie Award". It came in first in a FHM India list of the 57 worst movies ever made. Total Film included it in their list of the 66 worst films of all time. Amitabh Bachchan, who appeared in the original film and returned for the remake, later admitted that the film was "a mistake".

=== Epic Movie (2007) ===
Epic Movie is a parody film by Jason Friedberg and Aaron Seltzer that mainly parodies epic and fantasy movies, most notably The Chronicles of Narnia: The Lion, the Witch and the Wardrobe and the Harry Potter films, but also contains references to many other then-popular films. Like most works by Friedberg and Seltzer, it received extremely negative reviews, holding an approval rating of 2% on Rotten Tomatoes, and a Metacritic score of 17/100, indicating "overwhelming dislike".

Harry Fletcher of The Standard said: "Filmmakers and trash-peddlers Jason Friedberg and Aaron Seltzer have been responsible for some of the most pointless, lazy and unforgivable movies of the past decade and frankly, they need to be stopped. Disaster Movie, 300 spoof Meet the Spartans and awful Hunger Games mickey-take The Starving Games could easily have made this list of the worst movies ever made, but Epic Movie might be the worst of the lot." Meanwhile, Jamie Russell of the BBC called it "the most excruciating, unfunny film you'll see this year... if not your entire lifetime." Likewise, Nathan Rabin gave it an F score and said, "Epic Movie [...] strays so far from the solid fundamentals of filmmaking that it calls the very foundation of humor into question."

At the 28th Golden Raspberry Awards, it received three nominations, for Worst Remake or Rip-off, Worst Screenplay and Worst Supporting Actress (Carmen Electra). It is included in Rotten Tomatoes' list of the 100 Worst Movies of All time, Empire's and Flavorwire's lists of the 50 worst movies ever made, Standard's list of the 12 worst films ever made, MRQE's 50 worst movies list and Newsweek's list of the 50 worst comedy movies of all time.

=== I Know Who Killed Me (2007) ===
I Know Who Killed Me is a psychological thriller film directed by Chris Sivertson and starring Lindsay Lohan as identical twins, one of whom insists her identity is that of another woman after being abducted by a serial killer. At the 28th Golden Raspberry Awards, it set a record for most awards won in a single year by winning eight awards and it received two further nominations at the 30th Golden Raspberry Awards.

The How Did This Get Made? podcast questioned, "Is this the worst movie Lindsay Lohan has ever been in or flat out the worst movie ever?" Richard Roeper selected the film as the worst of the 2000s. Gabe Delahaye of Stereogum reviewed I Know Who Killed Me as part of his search for the worst movie ever made, writing that: "Out of all the possible Worst Movies of All Time so far, none has been as painful to actually watch as I Know Who Killed Me". It was named the 34th worst movie ever made in Empire's 50 Worst Movies Ever poll and AfterEllen named it the second worst ever made, after Gigli. MRQE includes it on its 50 Worst Movies list, and it has a rare F rating on CinemaScore.

=== Disaster Movie (2008) ===
Disaster Movie is a parody film written and directed by Jason Friedberg and Aaron Seltzer spoofing the disaster film genre and various other works of popular culture. The film, like most films by Friedberg and Seltzer, received extremely negative reviews and has a 1% rating on Rotten Tomatoes based on 73 reviews. The site's consensus states: "Returning to their seemingly bottomless well of flatulence humor, racial stereotypes, and stale pop culture gags, Friedberg and Seltzer have produced what is arguably their worst Movie yet." It was ranked by Rotten Tomatoes as one of the worst-reviewed films of all time. Jason Solomons of The Guardian stated that "Nothing can convey the grimness of Disaster Movie, which would be the Worst Movie Ever Made were it actually a movie at all." Adam Tobias of Watertown Daily Times claimed that "I just don't see how anyone could not find Disaster Movie one of the worst films of all time." Tobias went on to write that the title was appropriate because the film is "a disaster." It was featured in Empire's 50 Worst Movies Ever poll, Total Film's 66 Worst Movies Ever list, Metacritic's list of the all-time lowest-scoring films, and the MRQE's 50 Worst Movies list (where it holds a score of 17, the lowest score on the site). Disaster Movie also received a rare F rating on CinemaScore. The film is also notable for being the motion picture debut of Kim Kardashian, whose performance garnered a nomination for Worst Supporting Actress at the 29th Golden Raspberry Awards alongside five additional nominations.

=== Meet the Spartans (2008) ===
Another 2008 parody movie by Jason Friedberg and Aaron Seltzer, Meet the Spartans mainly parodied the movie 300, but it contained references to numerous other films as well. Like most Friedberg and Seltzer projects, it received extremely negative reviews, holding an approval rating of 2% on Rotten Tomatoes, with the consensus reading: "A tired, unfunny, offensive waste of time, Meet the Spartans scrapes the bottom of the cinematic barrel.", and a Metacritic score of 9/100, indicating "overwhelming dislike". Josh Levin of Slate called it the worst movie he had ever seen. It is included in Empire's and Flavorwire's lists of the 50 worst movies ever made, News.com.au's list of the 15 worst films of all time, Metacritic's list of the all-time lowest-scoring films, and MRQE's 50 Worst Movies list. At the 29th Golden Raspberry Awards, it received five nominations, including Worst Picture.

=== The Hottie and the Nottie (2008) ===
The romantic comedy The Hottie and the Nottie starring Paris Hilton, Joel Moore, Christine Lakin, and The Greg Wilson opened to poor box-office takings and strongly negative reviews with a 5% rating on Rotten Tomatoes. The British newspaper The People, reviewing The Hottie and the Nottie, claimed "Paris Hilton is the world's worst actress and she's starring in the worst movie ever made." Nathan Lee of The Village Voice called it "crass, shrill, disingenuous, tawdry, mean-spirited, vulgar, idiotic, boring, slapdash, half-assed, and very, very unfunny". Online film critic James Berardinelli described the film's comedy as "about as funny as the anal rape scene in The War Zone". Richard Roeper called it "excruciatingly, painfully, horribly, terribly awful", and argued that "nobody in this movie really should have a career in movies". Connie Ogle in the Miami Herald described The Hottie and the Nottie thus: "Imagine the worst movie you've ever seen. Got it? Now try to think of something worse. That something is this movie – wretched, embarrassing and a waste of the time and energy of everyone involved." The film appears on Metacritic's list of the all-time lowest-scoring films, and the MRQE's 50 Worst Movies list.

=== Álom.net (2009) ===
Álom.net (also known as Dream Well or Dream.net) is a Hungarian film that emulates tropes found in American teen films. 444.hu wrote that it is "the worst movie of all time, and that's why it became a cult film". Furthermore, 24.hu and Index.hu each named it the worst Hungarian film ever made and The Irish Times reported its status as "the worst film of all time" when it became the lowest-rated film on IMDb. Total Film named it the fourth worst film ever made and FMC.hu included it on their list of the ten worst films ever made.

=== After Last Season (2009) ===
After Last Season is a science-fiction psychological thriller film by Mark Region, focused on medical students who use brain chips to read minds in order to solve a murder. Much of the film consists of surreal CGI imagery representing psychic mind reading, but despite a claimed $5 million budget the film features extremely basic effects, including an MRI machine that is clearly made of cardboard. Chad Collins of Dread Central compared it to The Room, stating that its legacy is that it is "principally that of one of the worst movies ever made." C. Robert Cargill, writing for Ain't It Cool News, referred to the film as the "worst theatrically distributed film of the modern era." Writing for Collider, Jeremy Urquhart included the film on his list of the worst films ever made, stating that it is "Lynchian, or maybe it's more accidentally Lynchian."

== 2010s ==
=== Birdemic: Shock and Terror (2010) ===
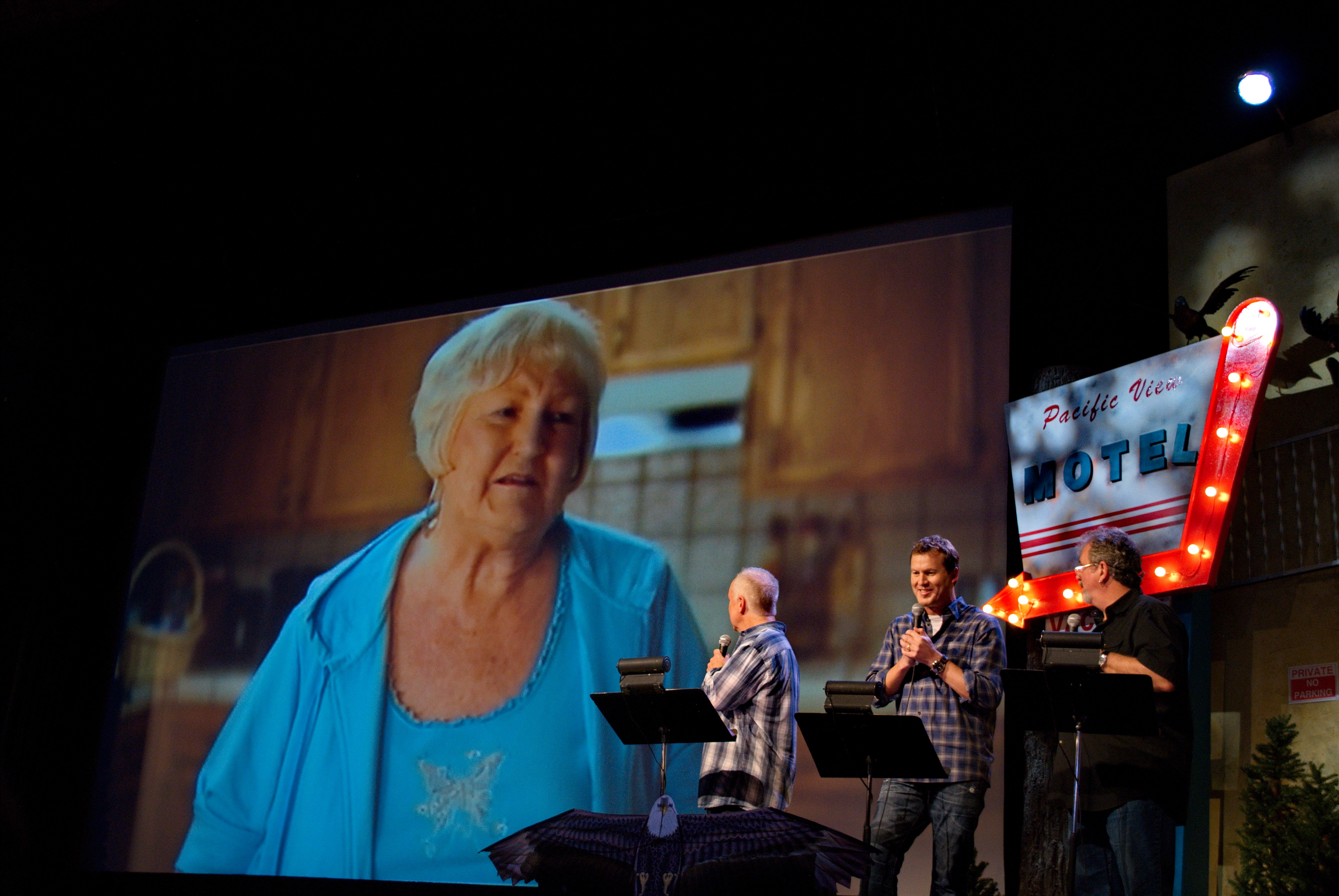
Bill Corbett, Mike Nelson, and Kevin Murphy during the live RiffTrax treatment of Birdemic

An independently produced film that is an apparent homage to Alfred Hitchcock's The Birds, Birdemic: Shock and Terror tells the story of a romance between the two leading characters, played by Alan Bagh and Whitney Moore, as their small town is attacked by birds. Written, directed, and produced by James Nguyen, it was intended as a "romantic thriller" but is notable due to its poor quality, with reviewers calling out its wooden acting, bad dialogue, amateurish sound and editing, nonsensical plot and, in particular, its special effects, consisting primarily of poorly rendered computer generated eagles and vultures that perform physically awkward aerial maneuvers and explode upon impact with the ground.

The film, which had a budget of $10,000, was called by the Huffington Post "truly, one of the worst films ever made" and by The Village Voice as "one more in the pantheon of beloved trash-terpieces". Flavorwire ranked it number 1 in its list of the 50 worst films ever made. Slate deemed it among the worst movies ever made, while Salon referred to it as "a cult hit among bad-movie fans" and Variety stated that the film displayed "all the revered hallmarks of hilariously bad filmmaking". Following the home media release of Birdemic, Michael J. Nelson, Kevin Murphy, and Bill Corbett of Mystery Science Theater 3000 fame produced an audio commentary track to accompany the movie through Rifftrax. They later riffed upon the film again theatrically. In response to the cult status of the first film, a sequel—Birdemic 2: The Resurrection—was released in 2013, and included many returning members of the cast and crew. Another sequel was released on several streaming platforms on January 24, 2023 titled Birdemic: Sea Eagle.

=== The Last Airbender (2010) ===
The Last Airbender is a fantasy adventure film written, produced, and directed by M. Night Shyamalan and is based on the Nickelodeon animated television series Avatar: The Last Airbender which is widely considered to be one of the best animated series of all time. Upon release, the film was widely panned with critics pointing out the bad acting, numerous plot holes, screenplay, dialogue, poor visual effects (despite its reported $150 million budget), and especially Shyamalan's directing. It was also ridiculed for the poor quality of its post-converted 3-D, and the casting of white and Indian actors to portray characters who were interpreted as East Asian or Inuit in the source material triggered accusations of racism and whitewashing. Further criticism came from fans of the animated series, who said the film differed tremendously from its critically acclaimed source material. David Onda of Comcast wrote that it "has been called one of the worst [films] ever made." Roger Ebert called the film "an agonizing experience in every category I can think of and others still waiting to be invented. The laws of chance suggest that something should have gone right. Not here. It puts a nail in the coffin of low-rent 3D, but it will need a lot more coffins than that." When asked if Last Airbender had been the worst film he has ever seen, Mike Ryan of Vanity Fair answered, "Yes."

It garnered nine nominations at the 31st Golden Raspberry Awards, and won five, including Worst Picture and Worst Director. Hi highlighted the film in their "Worst Films Ever" series, and Rotten Tomatoes, Screen Rant and Digital Trends included it in their worst film lists. Dev Patel would later express regret and dislike for his role and his experience with the film. He described his performance as Prince Zuko as being as though he "saw a stranger on the screen that I couldn't relate to."

=== Bucky Larson: Born to Be a Star (2011) ===
Bucky Larson: Born to Be a Star was produced by Adam Sandler's Happy Madison Productions and featured Nick Swardson in the titular role as a small-town manchild who pursues a career in the pornographic film industry after learning that his parents were porn stars in the 1970s. On Rotten Tomatoes, Bucky Larson has a 3% rating, and it appears on the site's list of the 100 Worst Movies of All Time. Linda Cook of the Quad-City Times described the film as "the worst of the worst", while ScreenCrush critic Matt Singer picked it as the worst film ever made. Jim Vorel of Paste's Bad Movie Diaries column suggested that Bucky Larson was the worst film covered by the column. In listing it as one of the ten worst comedies ever, Michael Musto stated that Bucky Larson was "a badness the world had forgotten was capable of existing". Screen Rant included it in its list of the 25 worst movies in film history and Mental Floss named it the fifth worst movie ever. Bucky Larson also appears on MRQE's 50 Worst Movies list, and Metacritic's list of the all-time lowest-scoring films. The film earned six nominations at the 32nd Golden Raspberry Awards, but lost in every category to Jack and Jill, which was also produced by Happy Madison Productions.

=== Jack and Jill (2011) ===
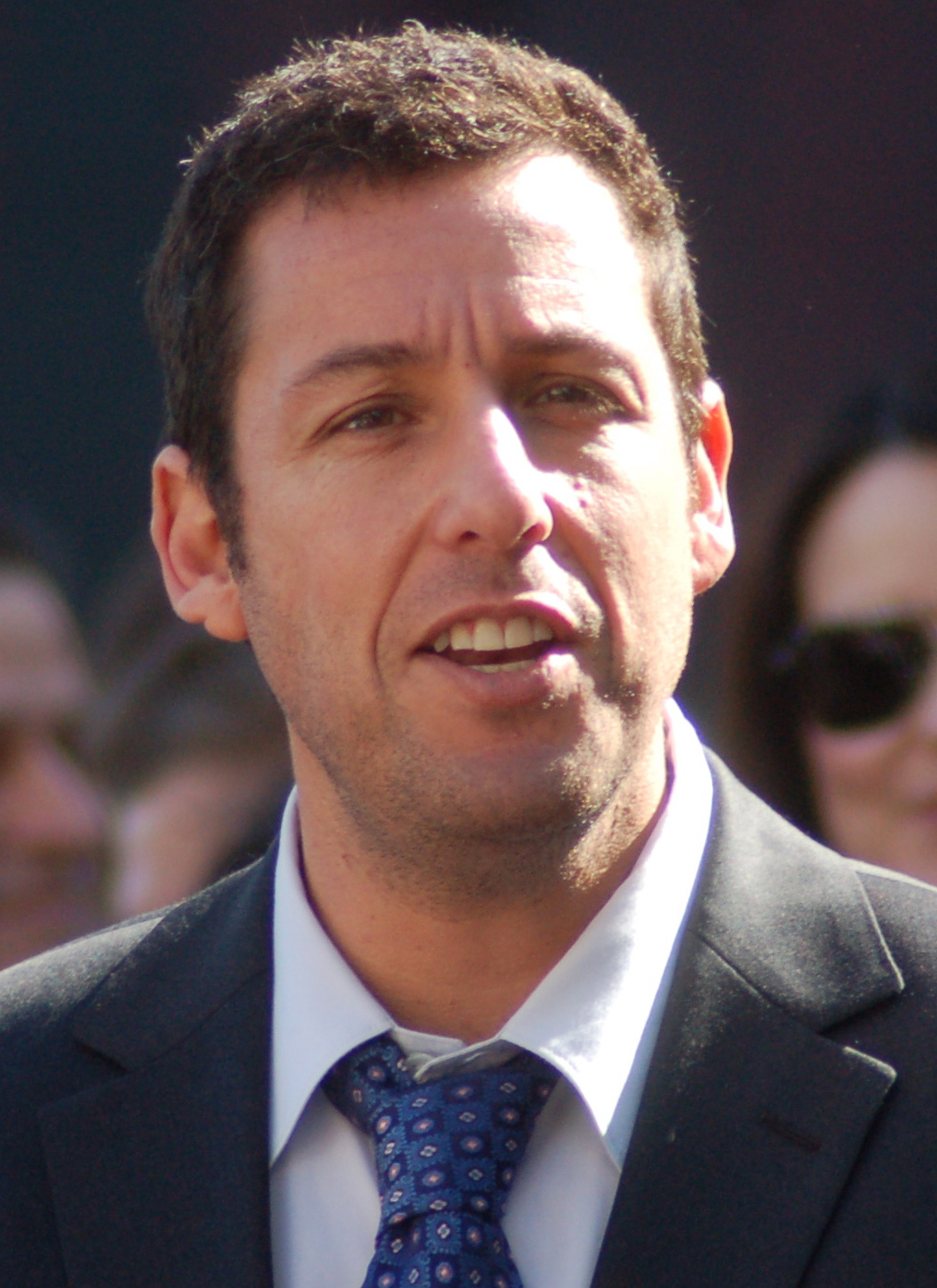
Adam Sandler starred in Jack and Jill and That's My Boy. He also produced these films, as well as The Master of Disguise and Bucky Larson: Born to Be a Star.

Jack and Jill is a comedy film starring Adam Sandler as Jack, a commercial director, who is visited by his "identical" twin sister, Jill (played by Sandler, in drag), during the holidays. Salon stated that Jack and Jill "received some of the worst reviews of any movie ever" upon its release. In the film, Jill is wooed by Al Pacino, whom Jack wants to be in his Dunkin' Donuts commercial. Richard Roeper of the Chicago Sun-Times noted the irony of Pacino's presence, as the actor is best known for playing Michael Corleone in The Godfather, which is widely considered one of the best films ever made, in this film, which he called "one of the worst movies in the history of cinema!" Ramin Setoodeh of The Daily Beast and Peter Travers of Rolling Stone reviewed it together in an article entitled "Adam Sandler's 'Jack and Jill' Is the Worst Movie Ever Made". After an hour-long critique, RedLetterMedia claimed that it was "so egregious that it ceased to be a film", and the site also later called it "the worst thing in the world". Mike McGranaghan wrote, on his website The Aisle Seat: "Howard the Duck, Gigli, Showgirls, From Justin to Kelly. What do they all have in common? They're all widely considered among the worst big studio movies ever made. You know what else they have in common? They're all better than Jack and Jill." Jack and Jill won a record 10 awards at the 32nd Golden Raspberry Awards, sweeping every category. It broke the record previously held by Battlefield Earth for having the most Razzies earned by a single film and is the only film to win every possible award. The film holds a 3% rating on Rotten Tomatoes, where it ranks as being one of the 100 Worst Movies of All Time. Vanity Fair and Screen Rant have also included it on their respective worst film lists.

=== That's My Boy (2012) ===
Another comedy film starring Adam Sandler, That's My Boy concerns a middle school student named Donny Berger who was statutorily raped by his teacher who falls pregnant, and, in turn, he earns the lifestyle of a minor celebrity, something he never intended to happen. Years later, Donny (played by Sandler) crashes his now-adult son's (Andy Samberg) wedding and bachelor party to get money to pay his taxes, therefore avoiding prison. The film has been widely panned due to its comedic portrayal of incest, hebephilia, statutory rape, and gerontophilia, with film critic Andrew O'Hehir of Salon stating, "[Sandler's] new movie about a rape survivor and his estranged son is supposed to be funny, but radiates pain and rage." Richard Roeper of the Chicago Sun-Times proclaimed, "To say That's My Boy is one of the worst movies of the year is to insult 2012. This is one of the worst movies I've ever seen", while Richard Haridly of Quickflix called it "one of the saddest and most exhausting" films he has ever seen. MaryAnn Johanson of Flick Filosopher outright panned the film for its inability to generate laughs as well as its depraved content, calling it "a disgusting excuse for a comedy" and possibly "the most repulsive movie I've ever seen", and Jonathan Lack of We Got This Covered declared, "That's My Boy isn't just the worst film of 2012, it's one of the most morally reprehensible comedies of all time, a disgusting movie you should stay far, far away from." Furthermore, Ed Whitfield of The Ooh Tray stated, "It may be the worst film, in any genre, ever made". In addition to the movie's overwhelmingly negative reviews, That's My Boy earned eight nominations at the 33rd Golden Raspberry Awards, such as Worst Picture and Worst Director, and won the awards for Worst Actor (Sandler) and Worst Screenplay. It holds a 20% rating on Rotten Tomatoes as of April 17, 2019 based on 115 reviews.

=== Foodfight! (2012) ===
The animated comedy Foodfight!, directed by Lawrence Kasanoff, features a cast of celebrity voice actors, including Charlie Sheen, Wayne Brady, Hilary Duff, and Eva Longoria. The film revolves around brand mascots, known as "Ikes", who come to life in a supermarket after closing time, and their struggles against the forces of Brand X. Several actual corporate mascots make cameos in the movie, such as Mrs. Butterworth, Charlie the Tuna, and the California Raisins. Development for the movie began as early as 2000, but troubled production, including an incident where hard drives containing the films' assets had supposedly been stolen, and financial difficulties delayed its release several times. The film eventually received a limited theatrical release in Europe in 2012, and it became a box-office bomb, earning just $74,000 against its reported $65 million budget. Foodfight! was also critically panned for its animation, humor, use of product placement as a central theme (and being aimed towards children), and content inappropriate for its target audience, such as sexual innuendo and references to Nazism.

The New York Times condemned the film, saying: "The animation appears unfinished ... And the plot ... is impenetrable and even offensive." The article also reported that Foodfight! had been "seized upon by Internet purveyors of bad cinema". One such Internet critic was Nathan Rabin of The A.V. Club, who included the film in his My World of Flops column, describing it as "one of those fall-of-civilization moments" and "This is the kind of movie so unbelievably, surreally and exquisitely terrible that you want to share it with the rest of the world. I was put on earth to suffer through abominations like Foodfight! so that society as a whole might benefit from my Christ-like sacrifice." Meanwhile, a review in Esquire described it as "The Room, rendered in horribly sharp polygons" and Hollywood News called it "by far the crappiest piece of crap I have ever had the misfortune to watch". Likewise, critic Tim Brayton described it as "the absolute ugliest animated feature that has ever been released by something resembling an actual animation studio ... one of the very worst movies I have ever seen." In 2024, Collider described it as the "absolute worst [movie] of the 21st century, without any real competition." Digital Trends, Time Out, Fotogramas, Mental Floss, and MSN have since included Foodfight! in their worst film lists. Rebecca Hawkes of The Daily Telegraph described Foodfight! as "the worst animated children's film ever made", while IndieWire, Comic Book Resources and Screen Rant have each described it as being one of the worst animated films ever made.

=== Run for Your Wife (2012) ===
A British comedy film based on the stage farce of the same name, Run for Your Wife starred Danny Dyer as John Smith, a bigamist, and Denise van Outen and Sarah Harding as his wives. Run for Your Wife was directed by the author of the play, Ray Cooney (who also makes an uncredited cameo appearance). Upon release, Run for Your Wife was savaged by film critics, with the South African newspaper Daily News saying "Run for Your Wife could be the worst film in history", the Studio Briefing website reporting that "Some writers are making the case that the British comedy may be 'the worst film ever'", and The Daily Mirror claiming Run for Your Wife "was branded the worst British film ever". Run for Your Wife met with such overwhelmingly negative reviews upon release that the reviews themselves were widely reported in the UK media. The film was variously described as "a catastrophe", "as funny as leprosy" and "30 years past its sell-by-date", with The Guardian reviewer Peter Bradshaw saying that it "makes The Dick Emery Show look edgy and contemporary". The Independent's Anthony Quinn wrote, "The stage play ran for nine years – it [the film] will be lucky to run for nine days. Perhaps never in the field of light entertainment have so many actors sacrificed so much dignity in the cause of so few jokes ... From the look of it, Cooney hasn't been in a cinema for about 30 years".

The cast featured numerous British celebrities in cameo roles, which was commented upon by several reviewers. The Metro commented that "no one emerges unscathed among the cameo-packed cast that reads largely like a roll-call for Brit TV legends you'd previously suspected deceased". The Daily Record described the film as "an exasperating farce containing not one single, solitary laugh. Comprised of people losing their trousers and falling over, the film looks like a pilot for a (mercifully) never-commissioned 70s sitcom". An article in the Independent described Run for Your Wife (along with the similarly panned Movie 43) as contenders for the title of the "worst film in history". The Berkhamsted & Tring Gazette reported "critics have been queuing up to batter recent release Run for Your Wife, with general agreement that it ranks among the worst British comedies of all time". Run for Your Wife was also a box office bomb, earning only £602 in its opening weekend at the British box office to its £900,000 budget. Run for Your Wife has a 0% rating on Rotten Tomatoes as of July 29, 2015 based on 15 reviews.

=== Fateful Findings (2012) ===
Fateful Findings is a 2012 independent techno-thriller written, directed and produced by Neil Breen. Breen also starred in the film and took on most of the crew roles, including film editor, sound editor, accountant, caterer, set designer, wardrobe, makeup and casting. The film follows an author-turned-hacker with supernatural powers who uses his abilities to reveal vague "government and corporate secrets", while beset by numerous relationship dramas, and ends with an extended sequence at a press conference where politicians and businesspeople confess to corruption and kill themselves before an applauding crowd.

Writing for Film Threat, reviewer Mike Hodges described it as "the worst movie ever made", comparing it unfavorably to Troll 2 and The Room. Nathan Rabin, writing for Rotten Tomatoes, said Fateful Findings threatens The Room's position as "best worst movie", while reviewers of the podcast The Flop House said "Move over The Room, move over Birdemic" and Mystery Science Theater 3000 head writer Elliott Kalan described it as the "good-est bad movie, maybe, I've ever seen". Paste Magazine said Fateful Findings sits "right next to [The Room] on the Mt. Rushmore of bad movies", and noted that while Tommy Wiseau had eventually embraced and encouraged mockery of The Room, Breen doesn't "pretend to be 'in on it'" and the film maintains a "magic" as sincere outsider art. Screen Rant and the New York Daily News later listed it as one of the worst films of all time.

=== Movie 43 (2013) ===
Produced and co-directed by Peter Farrelly, among others, Movie 43 is a gross-out sex comedy film consisting of several vignettes each by a different director and a sizable cast of recognizable actors and actresses including Dennis Quaid, Greg Kinnear, Hugh Jackman, Kate Winslet, Liev Schreiber, Naomi Watts, Anna Faris, Emma Stone, Richard Gere, Uma Thurman, Chloë Grace Moretz, Gerard Butler, Halle Berry, Stephen Merchant, Kristen Bell, Terrence Howard, Elizabeth Banks, Kate Bosworth, Johnny Knoxville, Justin Long, Chris Pratt, Josh Duhamel, and Jason Sudeikis. Holding a score of 5% on Rotten Tomatoes, it is included on the site's 100 Worst Movies of All Time list, and is also on the MRQE's 50 Worst Movies list. Movie 43 won three awards at the 34th Golden Raspberry Awards: Worst Picture, Worst Director, and Worst Screenplay. In the Worst Director category, all 13 directors won the award.

Several critics have called it one of the worst films ever made, including Peter Howell of the Toronto Star, who said, "There's just one use for Movie 43, apart from it being ground into the landfill that it deserves to become sooner rather than later. It provides me with a handy new answer to a question I'm often asked: 'What's the worst film you've ever seen?'" Brady Murphy of Murphy Reviews wrote that the movie "had no heart" and gave it the site's first zero out of ten rating. Meanwhile, Richard Roeper of the Chicago Sun-Times voiced similar hatred, calling it "aggressively tasteless" and "the Citizen Kane of awful." Lou Lumenick stated, "If you mashed-up the worst parts of the infamous Howard the Duck, Gigli, Ishtar and every other awful movie I've seen since I started reviewing professionally in 1981, it wouldn't begin to approach the sheer soul-sucking badness of the cringe-inducing Movie 43." Elizabeth Weitzman of the New York Daily News also considered it the worst movie she ever saw.

=== Humshakals (2014) ===
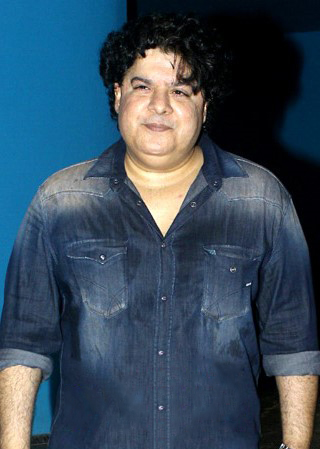
Critics condemned Sajid Khan's Humshakals as having succeeded his previous film, Himmatwala, in becoming the worst film in Bollywood history.

A Bollywood comedy film directed by Sajid Khan, Humshakals featured Indian actors Saif Ali Khan, Ram Kapoor and Riteish Deshmukh. On Rotten Tomatoes, the film has a 0% rating, based on six reviews, with an average rating of 2/10. Mihir Fadnavis wrote in his Firstpost review, "sexual tomfoolery, shrieking and hamming aside, there's much more to hate about this 'family movie'. It's disturbing to see such an atrocious, regressive, misogynistic, sexist, homophobic cinematic product force-fed to paying audiences. I can understand that a comedy need not be 'safe', but what goes on in Humshakals is simply too horrifying to bear." Saurabh Dwivedi of India Today stated "I can only say that Humshakals will be listed in one of the worst films of the century." Writing in Emirates 24/7, Sneha May Francis said that it succeeded Khan's previous endeavor, Himmatwala, in becoming the worst Bollywood film ever. Fadnavis went further, writing that it displaced Himmatwala as the "worst possible product any film industry in the world can offer". Itrath Syed of The Georgia Straight stated that Humshakals was "the absolute bottom of the cinematic barrel". The film received five Golden Kela Award nominations, and won the "award" for Worst Film. It also won two Ghanta Awards; the film won Worst Picture and Ram Kapoor, Saif Ali Khan and Riteish Deshmukh shared the Worst Actor award.

Several of the cast members also lamented their involvement in the film. Despite being the film's leading actress, Bipasha Basu did not participate in the film's promotions because she was "extremely disturbed by the end result" and stated that "Humshakals was the worst experience of my life". Another cast member, actress Esha Gupta, warned her family to not watch the film. After the release of the film, leading actor Saif Ali Khan lamented that "I've been introspecting a lot and will never repeat a mistake that was Humshakals."

=== Saving Christmas (2014) ===
Saving Christmas is a faith-based Christmas comedy film starring Kirk Cameron, who plays a fictionalized version of himself attempting to convince his brother-in-law (played by the film's director, Darren Doane) that Christmas is still a Christian holiday. On Rotten Tomatoes, the film has a 0% rating, based on 19 reviews, with an average rating of 2.40/10. Critic David Keyes described Saving Christmas as "The worst holiday movie ever made", Billings Gazette selected the film as the worst Christmas movie of all time, and Will Nicol of Digital Trends included it on his list of the ten worst movies ever made. Christy Lemire picked Saving Christmas as the worst film she has ever reviewed and called it "The Room of Christmas movies" (while adding that she found The Room to be more enjoyable) and gave it a score of zero stars out of four. Reece Taylor of Comic Book Resources also considers it the worst film ever made. The film's history after release was further marred by widespread vote brigading; Cameron asked fans to give the film positive reviews on Rotten Tomatoes, which resulted in a backlash of Internet users instead travelling to the Rotten Tomatoes page to review bomb the film. Three weeks after its release, Saving Christmas became the lowest-rated film on IMDb's bottom 100 list. Cameron blamed the low rating on a Reddit campaign by "haters and atheists" to purposely lower the film's ratings. The film won four awards, including Worst Picture, at the 35th Golden Raspberry Awards.

=== United Passions (2014) ===
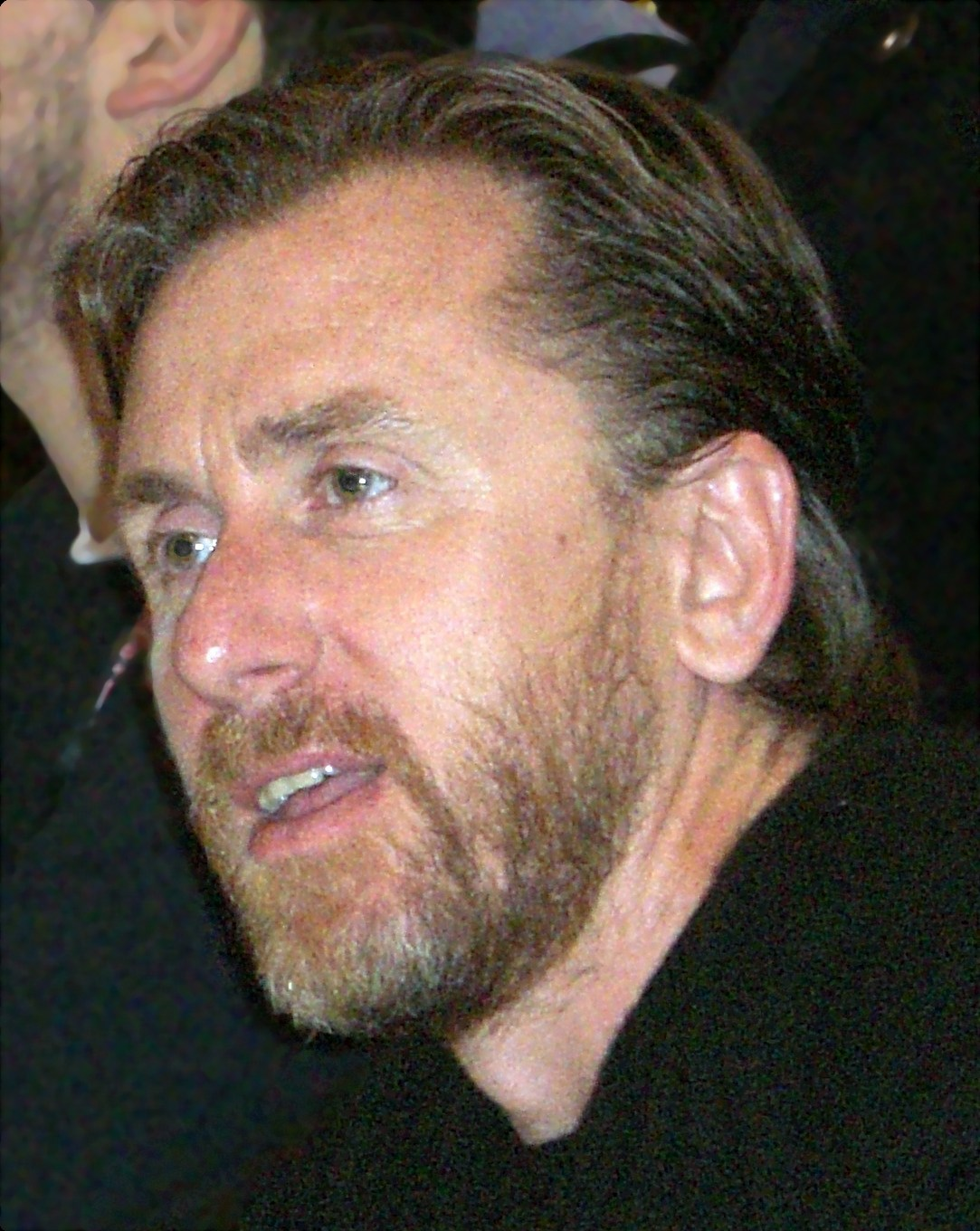
Tim Roth, who starred in United Passions, called it "awful". The movie received the first Barry L. Bumstead Award during the 36th Golden Raspberry Awards, and is tied for the lowest scoring film on Metacritic.

A 2014 English-language French drama film about the origins of the football world governing body Fédération Internationale de Football Association (FIFA), United Passions starred Tim Roth (as FIFA President Sepp Blatter), Gérard Depardieu and Sam Neill and was directed by Frédéric Auburtin. United Passions' release in the U.S. occurred simultaneously with the 2015 FIFA corruption case, in which several current and former members of FIFA's executive committee were arrested on charges of corruption, and Blatter himself resigned following repeated accusations of corruption at FIFA under his leadership. United Passions was accused of ignoring these long-running claims. London Evening Standard's Des Kelly wrote that United Passions was "the worst movie ever made" and "the most extraordinary vanity exercise; a vile, self-aggrandizing, sugar-coated pile of manure". Sean Mahoney of Inquisitr called it the "worst movie ever". Daniel Gold of The New York Times claimed United Passions is "one of the most unwatchable films in recent memory, a dishonest bit of corporate-suite sanitizing that's no good even for laughs", later stating it would make the top three of his list of all time bad films. Several critics noted the irony of the film's depiction of Blatter as an anti-corruption campaigner. Paul Field of the Daily Mirror said that this created "unintentional comedy gold". On Rotten Tomatoes, United Passions has an approval rating of 0% based on 16 reviews, while on Metacritic, the film holds a score of 1 out of 100, based on 9 critics, and is tied for the lowest scoring film on the site. Screen Rant subsequently included it on its list of the 25 worst movies of all time.

United Passions was also a box-office bomb, becoming the second-lowest-grossing film ever in American history, with a total take of $918, surpassed only by the 2006 thriller Zyzzyx Road. The film additionally went directly to DVD in France and was not distributed in a number of other European countries. Several of the people involved in United Passions later expressed regret over the film. Director Auburtin called United Passions "a disaster" and added: "Now I'm seen as bad as the guy who brought AIDS to Africa or the guy who caused the financial crisis ... apparently I am a propaganda guy making films for corrupt people." Roth apologized for taking part in the film and admitted that he took the job in United Passions for the money. It also received the first Barry L. Bumstead Award during the 36th Golden Raspberry Awards, a special category for critical and financial failures that were not given an eligible release.

=== Dirty Grandpa (2016) ===
Dirty Grandpa, a 2016 comedy film starring Robert De Niro and Zac Efron as a grandfather and grandson going to Florida during spring break, received negative reviews for its gross-out and shock humor that was also considered as sexist, homophobic, and racist. Mike Ryan of Uproxx said: "Dirty Grandpa is the worst movie I've ever seen in a movie theater. Burn it." He later also picked it as the worst film he had ever both reviewed and seen. Pete Hammond of Deadline Hollywood said the film "is not just the worst movie [De Niro] has ever been in, but it may be the worst movie anyone has ever been in." Glenn McDonald of Indy Week said: "The awful, ugly Dirty Grandpa is the comedy equivalent of torture porn ... In fact, in the dizzying moments after being bludgeoned by this miserable specimen, I was convinced it's among the worst movies ever made." Richard Roeper gave the film zero stars, writing, "If Dirty Grandpa isn't the worst movie of 2016, I have some serious cinematic torture in my near future." On his YouTube channel, Roeper also said: "I'm not ready to say Dirty Grandpa is the worst movie I've ever seen, but I'm also not ready to say it's not the worst movie I've ever seen." Mark Kermode, on his BBC Radio 5 Live show (Kermode and Mayo's Film Review), said that he found the film "truly, genuinely horrible" and went on to say, "after Dirty Grandpa I did feel genuinely unclean, I wanted to go and have a shower, because it's just so revolting. Somewhere in hell there is a multiplex playing this on a double bill, with Movie 43 and Entourage." He would later go on to brand it his least favorite film of 2016.

Glenn Kenny of RogerEbert.com said: "The actor Bela Lugosi appeared in some landmark, perhaps even great, films at the beginning of his Hollywood career in the 1930s. ... Lugosi's final film was 1957's Plan 9 from Outer Space, frequently cited as the worst film ever made. The cinematic landmarks of De Niro's career include films such as Coppola's The Godfather Part II and Scorsese's Raging Bull. He has been featured in a good number of very bad films in the years since. But this? This might just be his own Plan 9." The film has an approval rating of 10% at Rotten Tomatoes based on 135 reviews, with an average rating of 3.1/10, while on Metacritic it has a score of 21 out of 100 based on 27 critics, indicating "generally unfavorable reviews". At the 37th Golden Raspberry Awards it received five nominations, for Worst Picture, Worst Actor (De Niro), Worst Screenplay, and two nominations for Worst Supporting Actress (Julianne Hough and Aubrey Plaza), but did not win in any category.

=== Smolensk (2016) ===
Smolensk is a 2016 Polish disaster thriller film ostensibly about the Smolensk air disaster. It follows a TV reporter who, after meeting the families of the victims and witnesses, begins to question the official narrative and conducts her own investigation to uncover the truth about the plane crash. The film received negative reviews from the Polish press, who criticized its chaotic script and editing, low-quality special effects, poor acting, poorly written characters, the propagandist nature of the plot, and promotion of conspiracy theories about the disaster, with some comparing it unfavorably to Oliver Stone's JFK. The Polish entertainment website NaEkranie.pl described Smolensk's screenplay as "painfully heavy-handed" and compared special effects to that of "Sharknado without sharks" and the editing to Ed Wood's films. Simirally, Filmweb.pl criticized the film as "a bizarre mix of facts, conspiracy theories, speculation, and blatant distortions" and described it as "the result of the director’s artistic strategy, as he remains so fixated on a single version of events that he turns the story [...] into a caricature of the genre." Many critics also cited purported factual inaccuracies and found it insulting to the surviving families.

As of 2022, Smolensk had a rating of 1.2 out of 10 on IMDb, making it one of the lowest-rated movies on the website. The film also won seven categories at the annual Snake Awards presented to the worst Polish films: Worst Film, Worst Director, Worst Screenplay, Embarrassing Film on an Important Subject, Worst Actress, Worst Film Duo, and Most Embarrassing Scene.

=== Guardians (2017) ===
Guardians is a 2017 Russian superhero film about a team of Soviet superheroes created during the Cold War. It was criticized for having a derivative plot, bad acting and direction, cheap CGI, plot holes, and overall low quality. Kg-portal.ru wrote that "Guardians is a film from which Russian cinema should be protected. It's like a sequel to Plan 9 from Outer Space, filmed by Uwe Boll, with the screenplay by Tommy Wiseau and with him in the lead role." Rossiyskaya Gazeta commented that the film was "Worse than you can imagine." Meduza compared the film's director, Sarik Andreasyan, to Plan 9 from Outer Space's director, Ed Wood, and said that Guardians "is a convincing answer to the eternal question of why we can never catch up with Hollywood even in our own box office". Afisha said that it was the Russian answer to Howard the Duck, and Ivi, Inc. commented that "a more talentless film is hard to imagine". RIA Novosti placed it at the top of their worst film list and Russian review aggregator Kritikanstvo listed it among the all-time lowest-scoring films. Critics outside of Russia generally panned the film but were not as harsh, as it has a 33% rating on Rotten Tomatoes based on 12 reviews. A sequel was planned, but the film was a box-office bomb, which resulted in the film's production company, Enjoy Movies, subsequently filing for bankruptcy, and the Cinema Foundation of Russia, which provided part of the budget, suing the company and demanding a return of the investment.

=== Loqueesha (2019) ===
The 2019 comedy film Loqueesha stars Jeremy Saville, who also independently wrote, directed, and produced the film. Saville stars as Joe, who needs money to pay for his son's private school education and, after getting rejected for a job as a radio host, the listing for which encourages women and minorities to apply, gets the job by pretending to be a sassy black woman named Loqueesha who gives out advice on air. The film's trailer and poster were panned online as racist and stereotypical upon their release, with Entertainment.ie's Brian Lloyd writing that it was "one the [sic] worst fucking things we have ever seen, and we still can't believe it's actually real". Upon seeing the actual film, Nathan Rabin said that the film was "somehow much worse" than the trailer led people to believe.

The film was universally panned by critics, as it garnered a 0% rating on Rotten Tomatoes. Joel Golby of The Guardian called the plot "one of the more offensive in history", also criticizing its lighting, sound design, and acting, among other aspects of the film, and writing, "The worst film ever made. Worse than The Room, in every way. The one-star rating it currently has on IMDb is actively generous. I cannot believe this film got made." Dan Kahan of Popdust called it "genuinely the worst movie [he had] ever watched", calling Saville an "unbelievable racist" and deeming the movie "grotesque", "abhorrent", and "criminal". For Decider, Kay-B wrote that she "wouldn't recommend this film to anyone, living or dead" as it was "painfully hard to watch" while also dubbing it "the year's most reviled movie".

=== Cats (2019) ===
Andrew Lloyd Webber, who wrote the 1980s Tony Award-winning original stage version of Cats, called the film "ridiculous". It was widely panned for unusual CGI and poor performances.

Cats is a film adaptation of the popular musical penned by Andrew Lloyd Webber (based on the works of T. S. Eliot) and directed by Academy Award-winning filmmaker Tom Hooper (The King's Speech). The film is about a tribe of cats called the Jellicles as they hold their Jellicle Ball, an annual ceremony where the cats compete for the chance to enter the Heaviside Layer, where the chosen Jellicle will be granted a new life.

Lloyd Webber condemned the film as "ridiculous" stating, "The problem with the film was that Tom Hooper decided that he didn't want anybody involved in it who was involved in the original show." It was criticized for CGI "digital fur technology", which depicted the film's actors as bipedal cats. An updated version of the film, with a refined CGI patch, was sent to theaters after its premiere. Describing the experimentation with digital fur as one of the worst decisions in movie history, Rolling Stone wrote: "There are many, many other problems with Cats, ... but it was hard for anyone to focus on any of them when it just looked so shitty and disturbing." Other critics also panned the performances of some of the actors, with James Corden and Rebel Wilson (who parodied themselves at the 92nd Academy Awards) receiving the most criticism. As of June 2024, Cats sits at a 19% on Rotten Tomatoes. The film won six awards out of nine nominations at the 40th Golden Raspberry Awards, including Worst Director for Hooper, Worst Supporting Actress for Wilson, Worst Supporting Actor for Corden, and Worst Picture overall.

Early reviews for Cats were embargoed. Manohla Dargis from The New York Times commented that "[a] doctoral thesis could be written about how this misfire sputtered into existence". British newspaper The Daily Telegraph called the film an "all-time disaster" with reviewer Tim Robey giving the film "zero stars" in his review. Critics from The Washington Post, Rolling Stone and The Detroit News wrote that it was a candidate for the worst film of the 2010s, with The Detroit News reviewer Adam Graham writing: "Cats is the biggest disaster of the decade, and possibly thus far in the millennium. It's Battlefield Earth with whiskers." Graham later selected Cats as the worst movie he had ever seen. Wade Major of CineGods.com slammed it as "Showgirls with fur", while Battlefield Earth screenwriter J. David Shapiro (who previously won the Razzie for Worst Screenplay) said Cats had usurped his film as the worst ever made. Cats was included on Time Out's 40 Best Bad Movies Ever Made list.

== 2020s ==
=== 365 Days (2020) ===
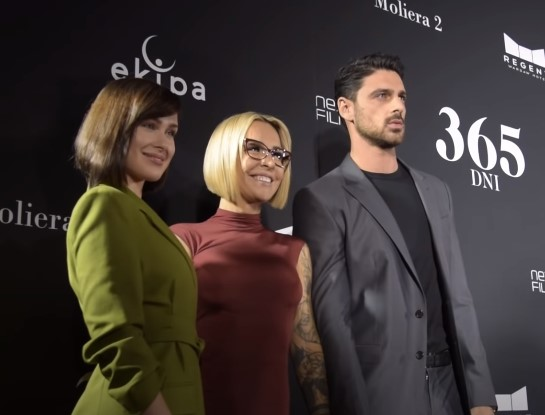
Anna-Maria Sieklucka, Blanka Lipińska, and Michele Morrone (from left to right) appeared at a promotional event for 365 Days.

365 Days (Polish: 365 Dni) is a 2020 Polish erotic romantic drama film directed by Barbara Białowąs and Tomasz Mandes. It is based on the first novel of a trilogy by Blanka Lipińska. The plot follows a young woman from Warsaw falling for a dominant Sicilian man, who imprisons her and gives her 365 days to fall in love with him. It stars Michele Morrone as Don Massimo Torricelli and Anna-Maria Sieklucka as Laura Biel. The film was released theatrically in Poland on February 7, 2020, where it was a box-office success with an estimated gross of $8,964,000. It was made available on Netflix on June 7, 2020, where, despite the negative critical response, it became one of the service's most-watched films and gained global attention. The film received overwhelmingly negative reviews for its softcore themes, sexual violence and Mafia glorification. Rotten Tomatoes collected 14 reviews and identified 0% of them as positive, with an average rating of 1.9/10. Several critics named it one of the worst films. Kevin Maher of The Times said "There haven't been line readings this poor since the third act of The Room" and "It makes the bonking puppets in Team America: World Police look like straight-faced documentary". Jessica Kiang of Variety called it "a thoroughly terrible, politically objectionable, occasionally hilarious Polish humpathon".

In March 2021, the film was nominated for six Golden Raspberry Awards, for Worst Picture, Worst Director, Worst Actor (Michele Morrone), Worst Actress (Anna-Maria Sieklucka), Worst Screenplay and Worst Prequel, Remake, Rip-off or Sequel, becoming the second foreign-language film to be nominated for Worst Picture after Italy's Pinocchio (2002; albeit the dubbed version), and won only one in the Screenplay category.

=== Sadak 2 (2020) ===
Sadak 2 (Hindi pronunciation: [sə.ɽək 2]; transl. Road 2) is a 2020 Indian Hindi-language action thriller road film directed by Mahesh Bhatt and produced by Fox Star Studios and Mukesh Bhatt under their banner Vishesh Films. A sequel to the 1991 film Sadak, it stars Sanjay Dutt (reprising his role from the original), Alia Bhatt and Aditya Roy Kapur in the lead roles with an ensemble supporting cast, while Pooja Bhatt makes a special appearance. The film marked Mahesh Bhatt's return as a director after 20 years as well as his final directorial work to date. The film's story takes place twenty-nine years after the events of its predecessor.

The film's trailer was released on 12 August 2020 on YouTube, and within a week, it became the second most-disliked video and the most-disliked film teaser/trailer on the platform due to internet users protesting nepotism in Bollywood after the death of Sushant Singh Rajput.

Sadak 2 was released on 28 August 2020 on the streaming platform Disney+ Hotstar in India and in U.S. theaters by Gravitas Ventures. The film was panned by critics, with criticism for its poor performance of the cast, script, dialogues and clichéd plot.

=== Winnie-the-Pooh: Blood and Honey (2023) ===
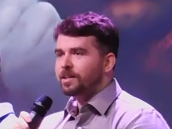
Despite grossing $7.7 million worldwide on a mere budget of $50,000, the 2023 slasher flick Winnie-the-Pooh: Blood and Honey (directed by Rhys Frake-Waterfield, pictured above) was critically panned for its cheap quality and poor execution.

Winnie-the-Pooh: Blood and Honey is a 2023 low-budget British horror film which reimagines the characters of the series of children's books by A. A. Milne as mutant slasher villains, released after Milne's work entered the public domain a year prior. It was widely criticized for its premise, alongside lack of humor, poor acting, low grade special effects, incoherent screenplay, poorly lit scenes and deaths of interesting characters. Nathan Rabin stated that the film was "the regrettable product of a loophole in copyright law that allowed these vultures to twist and distort and corrupt A.A. Milne's beloved icons of gentleness and childhood innocence to their own mercenary ends." Rabin issued his first zero star review for the film, in which he referenced Roger Ebert's 1994 review of North by stating: "I Hated, Hated, Hated Winnie-the-Pooh: Blood and Honey." With a score of 3% and a critical consensus simply reading "Oh, bother," it appears on Rotten Tomatoes' 100 Worst Movies of All Time list. Screen Rant later placed it at the top of their "10 Terrible Movies You Don't Have to See to Know They're Bad" list.

Shawn Paul Wood of The Cinema Spot wrote, "As anyone can tell, Winnie the Pooh: Blood and Honey is one of the worst movies ever made. And, by the looks of its dazzling lack of antipathy for protecting its copyright, Disney knew it." Matt Villei of Collider wrote, "If these reviews are anything to go by, the film might find itself in a spot of bother as it is being called one of the worst horror movies ever, though some predicted that, from its low quality, the film could garner a cult following similar to Tommy Wiseau's disasterpiece, The Room." It received all five Razzies that it was nominated for at the 44th Golden Raspberry Awards, including Worst Picture, Screenplay and Director (Rhys Frake-Waterfield).

A sequel, Winnie-the-Pooh: Blood and Honey 2 was released on 7 June 2024, received mixed reviews, and was deemed an improvement over its predecessor. A further sequel, entitled Winnie-the-Pooh: Blood and Honey 3, is set to release in 2026, this time directed by Scott Chambers.

=== Madame Web (2024) ===
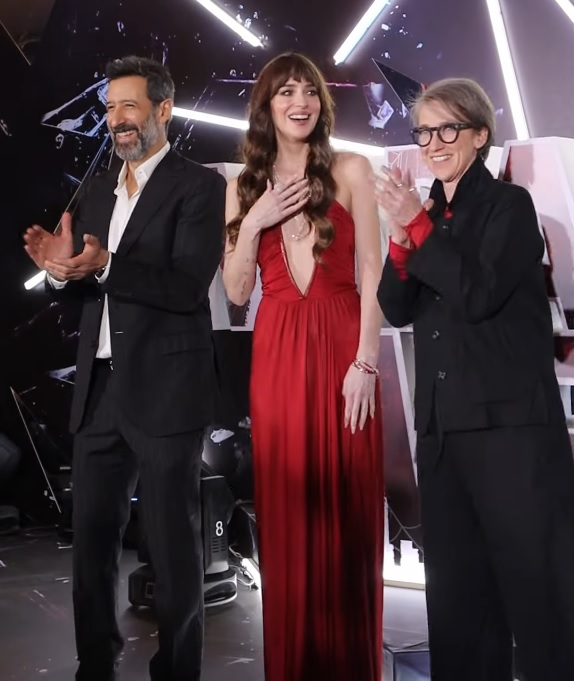
A promotional event for Madame Web, the fourth film in Sony's Spider-Man Universe. It was panned as the "worst comic book movie" yet and a future "camp classic", with Dakota Johnson and other cast members also lampooning its poor reception.

Madame Web is a 2024 American superhero movie featuring the Marvel Comics character of the same name, and the fourth film in Sony's Spider-Man Universe (SSU), a franchise based on characters and properties associated with the character Spider-Man, who is not prominently featured in it. Set in 2003, the movie depicts the origin story of Cassie Webb (Dakota Johnson), a woman who develops clairvoyant abilities and tries to save three young women (Sydney Sweeney, Isabela Merced, Celeste O'Connor) from Ezekiel Sims (Tahar Rahim), who wants to kill them before they become Spider-Women in the future and kill him. Upon its release, it was widely panned as being an "embarrassing mess" and "meme fodder", with Madame Web being regarded by some commentators as a "future cult classic" and a "camp classic".

Many described it as being the worst superhero movie or among the worst comic book movies ever made, including critics from The Daily Beast, USA Today, and the Chicago Sun-Times. Others went further; Josh Korngut of Exclaim! called it "One of the worst films in recent memory", while Hoai-Tran Bui of Inverse described it as "just about the worst movie you'd find at the bottom of that Walmart dollar bin". Fred Topel of United Press International defined it as "bad in ways even debacles like Catwoman and Batman & Robin never broached." David Fear of Rolling Stone panned it as "the Cats: The Movie of superhero movies", further calling it a "genuine Chernobyl-level disaster that seems to get exponentially more radioactive as it goes along". Collider also referred to the film as a "total disaster," placing it at the top of their list of "Movies So Bad You Can Actually Study Them." Other critics, such as Sam Adams of Slate, embraced its campy aspects, writing that the movie was "a blight on the history of superheroes and cinema itself. I enjoyed the hell out of it." Likewise, Harrison Brocklehurst of The Tab stated that Madame Web was "one of the worst films of all time – and yet I loved every stupid second of [it]."

The movie won three awards at the 45th Golden Raspberry Awards: Worst Picture, Worst Actress (Johnson), and Worst Screenplay. Johnson was not surprised by the film's poor reception, and Sweeney lampooned its performance. Merced embraced the film's reception with the various memes surrounding it and for her enjoyment of other camp films. Lorenzo Di Bonaventura described the film's reception as "an axe in your head" and a "harsher experience", not wanting to experience the "brutalness of failure" again when comparing the film's low box-office performance to its high viewership on Netflix. Sony had reportedly planned for Madame Web to be the first film in a potential new franchise before abandoning these plans due to the movie's critical and commercial failure.

=== War of the Worlds (2025) ===
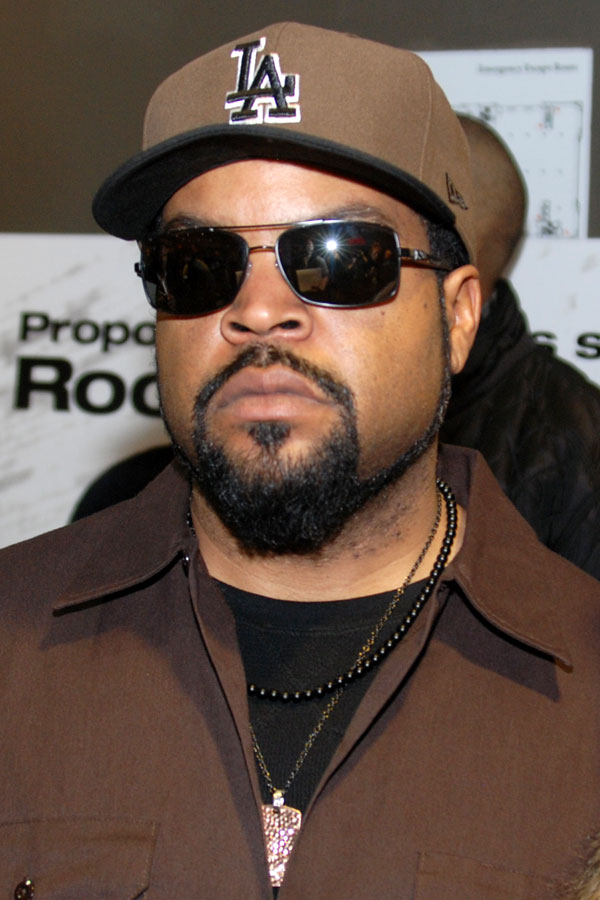
Ice Cube won a Golden Raspberry Award for Worst Actor for the 2025 film adaptation of War of the Worlds.

War of the Worlds is a 2025 American screenlife adaptation of H. G. Wells's 1898 science fiction novel The War of the Worlds. Filmed during the COVID-19 pandemic, Ice Cube stars as Department of Homeland Security (DHS) officer Will Radford, who reacts to footage of an alien invasion from his computer monitor. A review by Ed Power in The Daily Telegraph criticized Ice Cube's performance, writing that the film "features far too much of … Ice Cube staring at a computer screen while looking as if he's working through a reasonably urgent digestive ailment". Released through Amazon Prime Video, War of the Worlds was also criticized for widespread product placement, with Variety critic Peter Debruge writing, "How many people will watch this nonsense long enough to get to the part where the Prime delivery guy saves the day?"

An article in Collider named it the worst movie in the last 40 years and "a contender for the title of 'worst movie of all time'". Articles in Kotaku and Digital Spy similarly described it as one of the worst films ever made, and it prompted an article from BBC News regarding "terrible films" and the possibility of it being one of the worst. It has a score of 4% on Rotten Tomatoes and appeared on their 100 Worst Movies of All Time list. Described by the Golden Raspberry Awards as having become "a cult hate-watch classic almost immediately", it received six nominations at the 46th ceremony, including Worst Picture, Worst Director (Rich Lee), Worst Actor (Ice Cube), Worst Screen Combo (Ice Cube & His Zoom Camera), Worst Screenplay, and Worst Remake. It won every award that it was nominated for except Worst Screen Combo, which went to "All Seven Artificial Dwarfs" for Disney's remake of Snow White.

=== Niu Lai (2026) ===
Niu Lai (Chinese: 牛来) is a Chinese animated adventure film directed by Xin Yumeng and written by his mother, Sun Lifang. It is a coming-of-age story involving a bull, Niu Lai, and his adventures with a leopard that he has befriended. The film was developed over five years, with its animation produced using the architecture modelling software SketchUp on second-hand computer equipment, while Xin and Sun voiced every character and produced the soundtrack. Made for a few thousand yuan, it became a sleeper hit, ultimately grossing 59 million yuan and becoming one of the most profitable films of all time. Its success is attributed to hate-watching after having become a social media meme, although many of its defenders "hailed [it] as a bastion of hard work and free expression" as opposed to AI-created works.

Upon its release, Niu Lai received largely negative reviews from critics, with particular criticism directed at its animation and visual presentation. The Guardian quoted an industry professional who stated that the film was "bad in every aspect imaginable, including the story, special effects and almost every element that a movie is expected to have". Writing for The New York Times, Lily Kuo compared the film's animation to a Microsoft PowerPoint presentation. Ed Power, writing for The Daily Telegraph called it "unbelievably terrible" and compared its visual style to the 1985 music video for Dire Straits' "Money for Nothing". Film critic Jenni Zylka criticized the film’s sluggish dialogue and poorly synchronized lip movements, and compared the appearance of its cow character to the Teletubbies. The Beijing News criticized the film for potentially lowering audience expectations for poorly produced films and called for cinemas to stop screening it.

The San Francisco Chronicle described its reception as being "disaster-level", stating that Niu Lai "seems destined to belong to the same tradition" as Plan 9 from Outer Space and The Room, with each developing a cult following despite being considered the worst. Slate also compared its reception to both films. IndieWire described the film as a "baffling, often hilarious, even more often extremely boring" viewing experience, observing that the tedium it induces is "inherent to almost all of the most canonical worst movies ever" and suggesting that it could be "The Room for a new generation".

== See also ==
- List of 20th-century films considered the worst
- List of biggest box-office bombs
- List of films voted the best
- List of films with a 0% rating on Rotten Tomatoes
- Hate-watching
- Low culture
- Z movie
