= Birdemic: Shock and Terror =

2010 film by James Nguyen

- Theatrical release poster
- Directed by: James Nguyen
- Written by: James Nguyen
- Produced by: James Nguyen
- Starring: Alan Bagh; Whitney Moore; Janae Caster; Colton Osborne; Adam Sessa
- Cinematography: Daniel Mai
- Edited by: Kim Chow
- Music by: Andrew Seger
- Production company: Moviehead Pictures
- Distributed by: Severin Films
- Release date: February 27, 2010 (Silent Movie Theatre)
- Running time: 93 minutes
- Country: United States
- Language: English
- Budget: $10,000

Birdemic: Shock and Terror is a 2010 American independent romantic thriller-horror film written, directed, and executive produced by James Nguyen, and starring Alan Bagh and Whitney Moore. Inspired by Alfred Hitchcock's The Birds, Birdemic tells the story of a romance between the two main characters as their small town is attacked by birds. It was also inspired by the environmental documentary An Inconvenient Truth, which led to the film having an environmental message.

The film was largely self-financed and was produced through Nguyen's Moviehead Pictures company for a budget of $10,000. The film was panned by critics who lambasted its screenplay, direction, acting, cinematography, editing, production values, pacing, sound design, story and poor visual effects with some comparing it unfavorably to The Birds and citing it as one of the worst films of all time. After a limited theatrical release, the film was picked up for distribution by Severin Films in 2010. A sequel, Birdemic 2: The Resurrection, was released in 2013 while a second sequel, Birdemic 3: Sea Eagle, was released in 2022; both were also panned by critics.

== Plot ==
Rod is a young software salesman living a successful life in Silicon Valley. He meets up with old classmate and aspiring fashion model Nathalie and begins dating her. Things go well for the couple, with Rod receiving a large bonus that he uses to start his own business, while Nathalie is chosen as a Victoria's Secret model. As they grow closer, the couple remains oblivious to signs of something going wrong around them, such as unexplained wildfires and the carcasses of diseased birds turning up on beaches.

After having a romantic time and kissing in a motel, Rod and Nathalie wake up to find that their town is under attack from eagles and vultures. The birds spit acid and explode into flames upon striking the ground (having become mutated and toxic due to global warming). Rod and Nathalie escape from the motel by joining up with an ex-Marine named Ramsey and his girlfriend Becky. As they leave town, they rescue two young children, Susan and Tony, whose parents have been killed by the birds.

The group proceeds to drive from one town to the next, fending off more bird attacks along the way and briefly meeting a scientist named Dr. Jones studying the phenomenon. Becky is killed by the birds. Ramsey tries to save a busload of tourists. As they leave the bus, Ramsey and the tourists are killed by acid that is dropped by the birds. Nathalie stops Rod from attempting to rescue Ramsey because she fears the birds will kill him, too.

The group then continue to a gas station. The children purchase candies and Rod begrudgingly agrees to purchase gas for $100 a gallon. They then continue, running into a man who presumably needs help. This man, unnamed, then robs Rod for gas at gunpoint. As the robber slowly backs away from Rod, a bird suddenly slits his throat and he succumbs to his wounds on the side of the road.

Rod, Nathalie, and the kids then continue to flee from the birds, driving into a forest where they briefly meet a "tree hugger" named Tom Hill, who talks to them about the dangers of global warming. After escaping a forest fire, the quartet ultimately settles on a small beach, where Rod fishes for dinner. As they prepare to eat, they are attacked by the birds, but then doves appear and all the birds leave in peace. The film ends as Rod, Nathalie, and the kids watch the birds fly off into the horizon.

== Cast ==
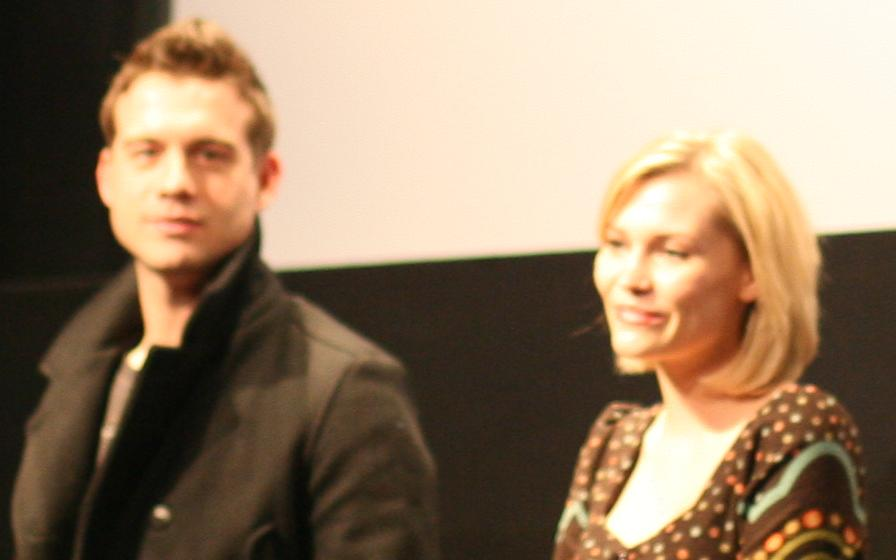
Bagh (left), and Moore (right) at a screening of the film

- Alan Bagh as Rod
- Whitney Moore as Nathalie
- Adam Sessa as Ramsey
- Catherine Batcha as Becky
- Janae Caster as Susan
- Colton Osborne as Tony
- Rick Camp as Dr. Jones
- Stephen Gustavson as TreeHugger/Tom Hill
- Eric Swartz as Bill Stone/CEO
- Patsy van Ettinger as Nathalie's Mother
- Mona Lisa Moon as Mai
- Danny Webber as Rick
- Laura Cassidy as News Anchor
- Gregor Martin as News Anchor (2)
- Fraser Jarvie as Band Member
- Shea Clark as Band Member (2)
- Damien Carter as Nightclub Singer
- Jake Pennington as Clark
- James Nguyen as a restaurant customer (cameo)

== Production ==
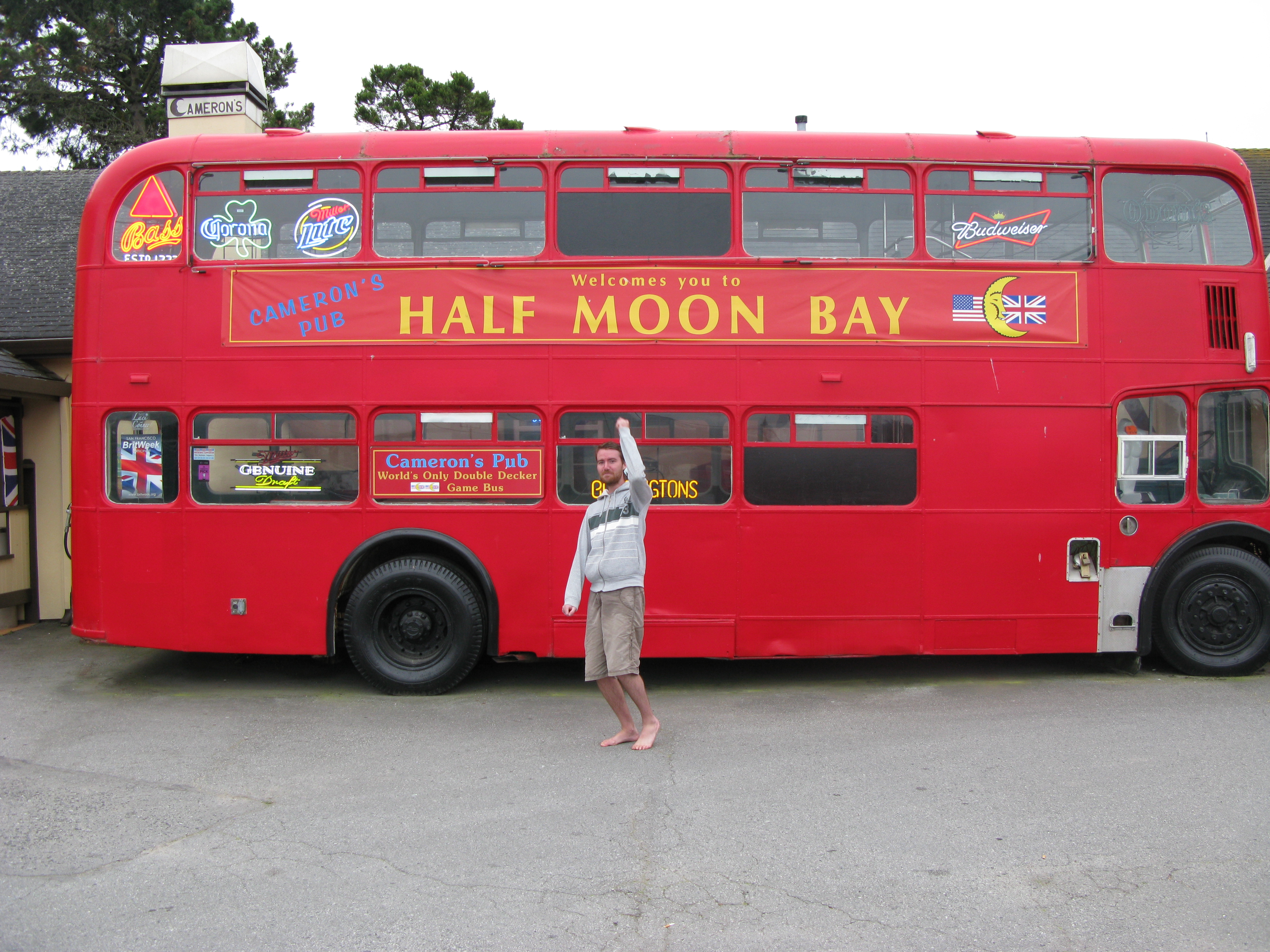
A bus featured in one sequence

Nguyen was inspired to write the script for Birdemic: Shock and Terror while spending time relaxing in Half Moon Bay, California. Birdemic began production in 2006 and took four years to produce, partly due to time limitations involving the cast and crew—principal photography was done mostly on weekends over the course of seven months—and also due to financial restraints, as it was financed through Nguyen's day job, plus the time it took for Nguyen to find a distributor.

Nguyen met Bagh at a college acting class. Nguyen invited him to an audition to Birdemic, where he eventually got the part. Nguyen met Moore at a parking lot, where she discussed with him how she just graduated from high school and wanted an acting career. Her audition for the film happened right there in the parking lot, which is where she eventually got the part for the film. Nguyen met Gustavson in Oregon where he was visiting his sister.

The film contains several anti-war statements. On the DVD commentary, the director explained that one early inspiration for the film was the anti-war film Apocalypse Now, and that at the end of the film the birds stopped their attack because they wanted to have peace and to give humans a second chance to help the environment. He said that as production continued, he became more influenced by Al Gore's film An Inconvenient Truth which is about global warming. The film was one of several in an uptick of bird horror films inspired by Hitchcock's film, beginning in 2007 with Kaw and continuing with Flu Bird Horror in 2008.

During the filming of Birdemic, Nguyen instructed star Whitney Moore not to socialize with her costar Alan Bagh after filming. On the commentary, Moore said they did not get permits to film at specific locations, instead just showing up, and sometimes getting kicked out. She said that at one point, they were filming on a public jogging trail, and Nguyen started yelling at joggers who were getting in the shot. Moore told him not to yell at people who were not associated with the film, and he responded by refusing to talk to her for three weeks. He gave her direction using her costar Bagh as an intermediary.

In a 2020 interview, Whitney Moore stated that she received a phone-call from Nguyen only an hour after her audition saying that she got the part, which helped her realize that the film wasn't going to be good. She also stated that the romantic motel scene in the film was re-filmed at least eight times, which made her uncomfortable.

In a 2021 interview, Stephen Gustavson, who played the "treehugger" gives credence to the notion that permits were not obtained, mentioning that during the filming of his scene, Nguyen spotted a park ranger nearby and advised the cast and crew to pretend they were having a picnic.

The film was produced with a budget of $10,000, but the distributors have spent more on marketing than it cost to produce the film and purchase the rights. There were not many crew members on the film with the actors performing many of the roles that would normally be performed by crew members. They often held their own microphones, sometimes between their knees. Moore was in charge of the makeup after the first two makeup women quit. The film uses fake names for crew members in the credits, in order to appear more legitimate.

== Release ==
On February 27, 2010, Birdemic received its Los Angeles premiere at the Silent Movie Theatre, sponsored by Bloody Disgusting and hosted by Tim Heidecker and Eric Wareheim, followed by a cast-and-crew attended screening at the Alamo Drafthouse in Austin, Texas on March 2, with follow-up screenings in Tempe, Arizona and New York City.

Severin Films acquired the film in early 2010 and launched the Birdemic Experience Tour 2010, which showed the film in numerous cities in the United States and Toronto, Canada from April through July 2010. Birdemic premiered in the United Kingdom at The Curzon Soho in London on May 28, 2010.

=== Promotion ===
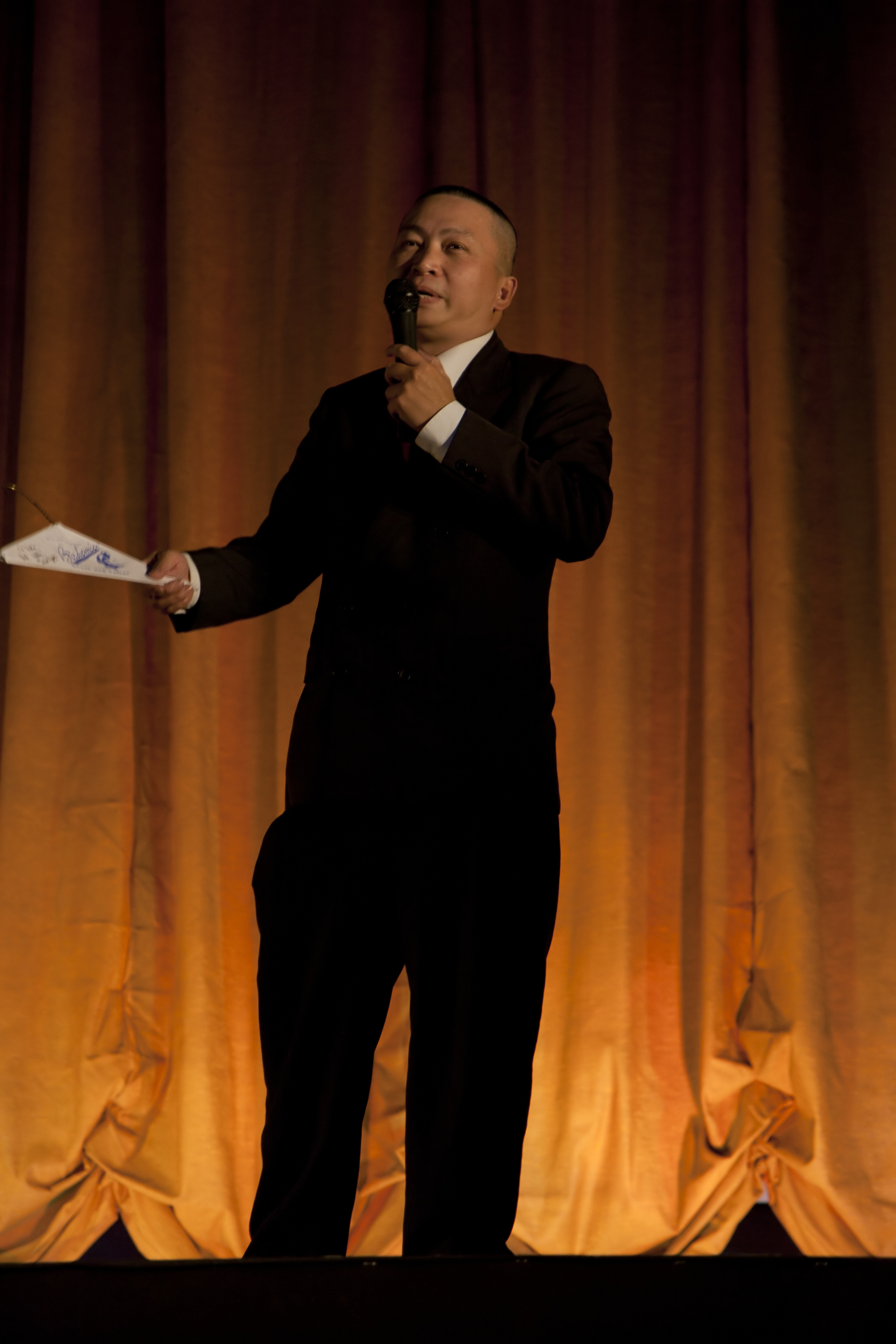
James Nguyen, director of the film, speaking at a screening

In January 2009, Nguyen traveled to the Sundance Film Festival in Park City, Utah to promote the film freelance, handing out flyers to passers-by from his van, adorned with stuffed birds and misspelled paper signs that read "BIDEMIC.COM" and "WHY DID THE EAGLES AND VULTURES ATTACKED [sic]?", and renting out a local bar to screen the film. Word of mouth eventually gave Birdemic attention from horror movie websites Dread Central and Bloody Disgusting, while the trailer was featured on the July 30 episode of G4's Attack of the Show.

=== Home media ===
In early 2010, Birdemic was picked up by Severin Films with plans to release the film on home media. Birdemic was released on DVD and Blu-ray Disc on February 22, 2011. The DVD's special features include an audio commentary by James Nguyen as well as one by lead actors Alan Bagh, Whitney Moore, and a fan who discovered the film, Bobby Hacker. The Blu-ray also features two deleted scenes, a feature on the Birdemic Experience Tour, and an episode of the public-access San Francisco TV show Movie Close Up which features Nguyen and was aired as Birdemic was still in production (the host of the show, Bonnie Steiger, later played an extra in the bus rescue scene of Birdemic). It is also available on demand at Amazon via Fandor and on the free streaming service Tubi.

== Reception ==
On a 2009 "Best of" list, Bloody Disgusting listed Birdemic amongst its honorable mentions, calling it "the best worst film you'll see in 2010". The Huffington Post referred to the film as "truly, one of the worst films ever made." Variety reported: "Birdemic displays all the revered hallmarks of hilariously bad filmmaking: inane dialogue...miscued music, godawful sound...and special effects that simply must be seen to be believed: birds dive-bombing and exploding in red-and-yellow poofs of smoke, and clip-art eagles, crudely pasted on the screen, with only their wing tips mechanically flapping." The Village Voice described Birdemic as "one more in the pantheon of beloved trash-terpieces." Salon commented on the "atrocious CGI" and reported that the film had become "a cult hit among bad-movie fans."

An online review from the Independent Film Channel stated that the film feels "indebted to Wood's Plan 9 from Outer Space with its blend of ultra-low budget filmmaking and cuckoo bananas ecological message." The Guardian and The New York Times reported on the film's cult status, with The Guardian writing: "Birdemic features acting as wooden as a tree, clunky camera work...and crude special effects that reduce audiences to tears of laughter rather than terror." Slate wrote: "aspects of Birdemic can seem too bad to be true...The film's artlessness comes to function as its own sort of hallucinatory art...we see the narrative space of the film breaking down and rebuilding itself constantly—bloody stitches on its forehead, bolts in its neck. This breakdown can be profoundly discomfiting and surprisingly infectious." As of December 2025, the film holds an 19% approval rating on Rotten Tomatoes, based on 16 reviews with a weighted average rating of 2.55/10.

Tim Heidecker and Eric Wareheim, who hosted the Los Angeles premiere, parodied the movie on their television series Tim and Eric Awesome Show, Great Job! in the 2009 episode "Crows". On the February 25, 2011 episode of The Soup, scenes of Birdemic, especially an elongated scene in which employees clap incessantly at the company's good financial news, was the "Clip of the Week". The Bob Buel Ridicule Theatre podcast featured both Birdemic and its sequel on its show, mocking the films extensively. A live show of the podcast How Did This Get Made? released on February 28, 2012 and starring cast member Whitney Moore and guest star "Weird Al" Yankovic (who states that he is a fan of the film) is dedicated to discussing Birdemic.

A RiffTrax for Birdemic was released on February 22, 2011, featuring commentary by Michael J. Nelson, Bill Corbett and Kevin Murphy of Mystery Science Theater 3000 fame. The release of their commentary was quickly followed up by recreations of seven humorous scenes from the film. On October 25, 2012, Fathom hosted a RiffTrax Live event featuring Birdemic. A physical DVD as well as a digital download of the show was released on November 25, 2014.

On August 4, 2016 an episode of Vice Media's filmmaker documentary series Outsider featured the history of the film's production, discovery, and release, as well as James Nguyen's future ambitions.

The film was mentioned and had a scene shown on The Ellen DeGeneres Show by comedian Howie Mandel, who jokingly asked if Martin Scorsese directed the film.

== Sequels ==
A sequel, Birdemic 2: The Resurrection, also written and directed by Nguyen, finished filming in March 2012, and was released in April 2013 with a special screening in Los Angeles followed by a tour to select theaters in the United States, and released online on April 16, 2013. The plot centers around a struggling Hollywood filmmaker named Bill (Thomas Favaloro), who casts an aspiring actress named Gloria (Chelsea Turnbo) in his upcoming film before eagles and vultures attack. Alan Bagh and Whitney Moore reprised their roles for the sequel, as did Colton Osborne, Rick Camp, Stephen Gustavson, Eric Swartz, Patsy van Ettinger and Damien Carter.

In a 2016 Vice interview, Nguyen said that he was hoping to eventually make Birdemic 3: Sea Eagle, which would be his next installment in the franchise. In October 2016, an Indiegogo campaign was raised in order to finance the third film of the series. The funding was eventually closed, with only roughly $596 out of the desired $500,000 raised. Despite this, it was announced in March 2021 that production on the third installment had begun, and the film's poster was released on November 9, 2021 on the Moviehead Pictures Twitter page. Birdemic 3 premiered at Fantastic Fest on September 25, 2022, and was released on several streaming platforms on January 24, 2023.

== See also ==
- List of 21st century films considered the worst
- The Birds II: Land's End
