= Hate-watching =

Watching a TV show or film with the intent of mocking it

Hate-watching is the activity of consuming media, usually a television show or a film with the intention of acquiring amusement from the mockery of its content or subject. Closely related to anti-fan behaviours, viewers who partake in hate-watching derive pleasure and entertainment from a show's absurdities or failures. The act of hate-watching is premised on the audience engaging with media through a satirical lens.

== History ==
=== Theorisation ===
Early online hate-watching communities emerged with sites like Television Without Pity in 1998, which gleefully criticised every new episode of the teen series Dawson's Creek. In 2012, Emily Nussbaum discussed the concept in New Yorker, specifically regarding the television program Studio 60 on the Sunset Strip which had acquired an audience of hate-watchers, as "it was bad in a truly spectacular way—you could learn something from it, about self-righteous TV speechifying and failed satire and the dangers of letting a brilliant showrunner like [Aaron] Sorkin run loose to settle all his grudges in fictional form".

Entertainment Weekly and other publications noted the difference between hate-watching and watching as a guilty pleasure. "You wouldn't tune in every week to hate-watch a really bad reality show. Generally speaking, hate-watching requires a TV series with high ambitions and features a certain amount of aesthetic perfection".

While guilty pleasures are shows enjoyed despite acknowledged flaws, hate-watching involves actively seeking out and criticizing those flaws as the primary motivation. Shows like Emily in Paris, which have high production value but are often considered poorly written or unrealistic, are prime examples of media that attract hate-watchers. That is also why some initially well-received shows, like The Bold Type, can become objects of hate-watching as their quality declines.

However, some, like Andrew Fleming, producer of Emily in Paris, doubt the existence of genuine hate-watching, suggesting that viewers are simply driven by a desire to mock popular entertainment.

=== Evolution ===
The rise of social media significantly popularized hate-watching, and streaming services, with their binge-watching model, further contributed to the phenomenon. The ability to binge-watch entire seasons at once made it easier to consume and interact with large amounts of content, even if it is disliked.

The popularity of hate-watching on social media can make poorly received shows trending topics. This can lead to increased viewership and ultimately benefit the show. As the term gained popularity, many anti-fans have asked others to not hate-watch, as they believe doing so will have the unintended effect of making the media they dislike seem more popular than if they had not hate-watched. Velma is one such example of this phenomenon, where hate-watching is supposedly the lead cause of the show being renewed for a second season.

Hate-watching, because of the streaming algorithms focused on viewership metrics, can indeed contribute to a show's success even if viewers dislike it. This can create a self-perpetuating cycle of hate-watching and ultimately encourage the production of "hate-watchable" content, potentially lowering the overall quality of programming.

In a Los Angeles Times article describing the complexity of effects of U.S. presidential candidate Donald Trump's November 2015 appearance on Saturday Night Live as host, writer Mary McNamara references the hate-watching phenomenon as a reason that ratings alone are not an indication of support. An article from The New York Times also pointed out the successful ratings for Trump's presidency.

== Motivations ==
Some viewers may hate-watch to assert their good taste and cultural superiority by criticizing supposedly inferior programs. In a February 2020 article, Spanish television reviewer Borja Terán described the reason behind the success of Telecinco and its reality show-based lineup (specifically mentioning Supervivientes, the nineteenth season of which had premiered the night prior to the post): "the viewer feels superior to the guinea pigs taking part in the televised competition. They feel better with themselves and evade from personal problems by spending energy torpedoing a mere entertainment they follow through a screen."

=== Social aspects of hate-watching ===
Hate-watching can be a shared experience, allowing viewers to achieve a sense of community and validation among those who share the same negative opinions about a show or a film. Viewers often share their critiques online, with their friends and followers on social media and forums.

Eventually, some hate-watching communities can demonstrate an even stronger engagement for a piece of media than traditional fandoms through a genuine, albeit negative, attachment.

==== Relationship with anti-fan culture ====
Contrary to typical fan behaviour where audience members consume a piece of media with the intent to acquire pleasure from its contents, the pleasure anti-fans derive from a piece of media is rooted in its perceived shortcomings. Viewers engage in hate-watching for the amusement derived from mocking its content or subject.

In a study conducted in 2005 on Television Without Pity, a since-defunct website that hosted discussions about television shows, Gray points out the patterns of anti-fan behaviours exhibited by its users. Unlike individuals who participate in fandom culture out of love for a particular piece of media, anti-fans engage with a piece of media out of dislike for it. The forums hosted on Television Without Pity expressed anti-fan sentiments where users would watch a television show, often critiquing and pointing out its perceived shortcomings.

=== Psychological explanations ===
Hate is more intense and morally charged than dislike. The person is more likely to simply change the channel if said person dislikes the show. Watching something that elicits negative emotions like hate, disgust, or contempt allows viewers to release aggressive impulses without guilt or harm. Experiencing such strong emotions, even negative ones, can trigger the release of "happy hormones" like oxytocin, dopamine, and serotonin.

Hated shows feel personally offensive and encourage a desire to take action, such as by commenting or tweeting. Hate-watching can also be a way for viewers to explore their limits of tolerance for bad content, pushing boundaries of discomfort and challenging themselves.

== Risks ==
Even though hate-watching is mostly lighthearted and humor-oriented, it can sometimes mask genuine hate speech, particularly targeting marginalized groups. It can desensitize viewers to such criticism and attacks, making them more prone to hate speech in other areas of their life. The negative emotional release and social validation associated with hate-watching can become excessive and even addictive.

== Examples of hate-watching shows ==
- 13 Reasons Why
- Alias
- American Horror Story
- And Just Like That
- Away
- The Bachelor
- Barney & Friends
- The Big Bang Theory
- The Bold Type
- Castlevania: Nocturne
- Chrisley Knows Best
- Dawson's Creek
- Devil May Cry
- Elite
- Emily in Paris
- Entourage
- Euphoria
- Fallout
- Family Guy
- Flavor of Love
- Full House
- Game of Thrones
- The Gilded Age
- Girls
- Grey's Anatomy
- Gypsy
- Hemlock Grove
- Here Comes Honey Boo Boo
- Heroes
- The Hills
- Hollywood
- House Hunters
- How to Get Away With Murder
- The Idol
- Insatiable
- The Jerry Springer Show
- Keeping Up with the Kardashians
- Love Island
- Lunatics
- The Magic Hour
- Marco Polo
- Marseille
- The Millionaire Matchmaker
- The Morning Show
- My Little Pony: Friendship is Magic
- The Newsroom
- Pretty Little Liars
- Real Housewives
- Revenge
- Rick and Morty
- Riverdale
- Say Yes to the Dress
- Selling Sunset
- Sex and the City
- The Simpsons
- Singapore Social
- Smash
- Star Trek: The Next Generation
- Star Trek: Picard
- Studio 60 on the Sunset Strip
- Survivor Spain (Supervivientes)
- Teen Titans Go!
- Tiny Pretty Things
- Toddlers & Tiaras
- Too Hot to Handle
- True Blood
- The Vampire Diaries
- Vanderpump Rules
- Velma
- Vinyl
- The Walking Dead

== Examples of hate-watching films ==
- Brain on Fire
- The Cloverfield Paradox
- Death Note
- Magic Mike XXL
- Niu Lai
- The Kissing Booth
- Persuasion
- Polar
- Rebecca
- The Ridiculous 6
- Secret Obsession
- The Sharknado series
- The Silence

== See also ==
- Anti-fan
- Binge-watching
- Cinephilia
- Doomscrolling
- List of television shows notable for negative reception
- List of films considered the worst
- Quality television
- Television addiction
