= James Nguyen =

American-Vietnamese film director and producer

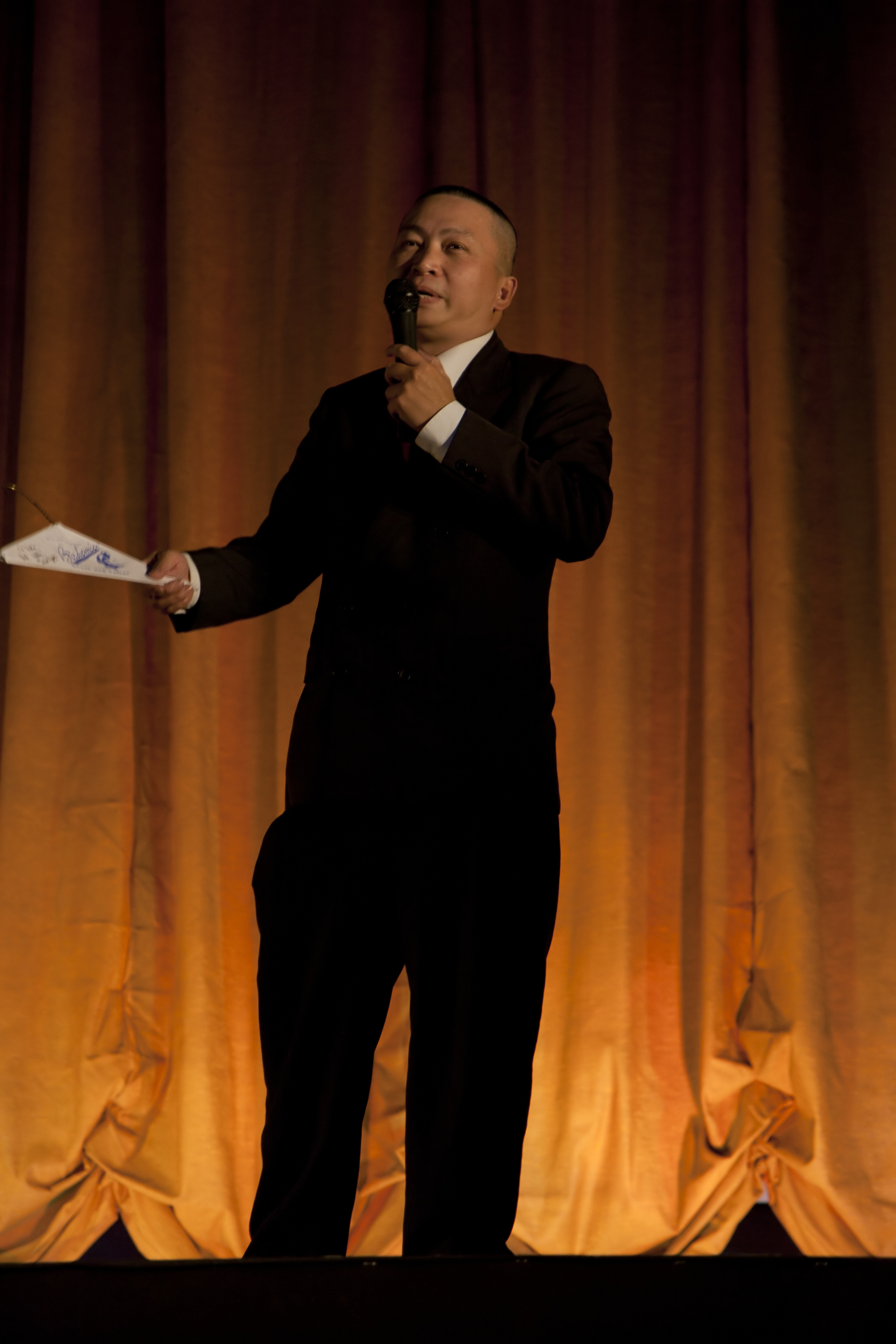
- Nguyen speaking at a screening of Birdemic: Shock and Terror in 2010
- Born: James Nguyen; September 1, 1966 (age 60); Danang, South Vietnam
- Occupation: Film director
- Years active: 2003–present
- Children: Jennimai Nguyen

James Nguyen (born 1 September 1966) is a Vietnamese filmmaker known for directing the 2010 romantic horror film Birdemic: Shock and Terror, as well as its sequels Birdemic 2: The Resurrection and Birdemic 3: Sea Eagle.

== Life and career ==
Nguyen was born in Danang, South Vietnam. He and his family fled the country shortly before the Fall of Saigon. He never received any formal training in filmmaking, but instead grew up watching the films of director Alfred Hitchcock, including 1958's Vertigo and 1963's The Birds. Nguyen went on to be a software salesman in Silicon Valley. He first picked up a camera in 1999.

In 2003, he directed the low-budget romantic film Julie and Jack. In 2005, he directed the science fiction thriller Replica, inspired by Vertigo, but it was not released until 2017; Nguyen blamed the outcome on the expensive storyboarding process and his casting decisions. Nguyen's popularity as a director rose in 2010 with the release of the film Birdemic: Shock and Terror. He was inspired to write the script for the film while spending time relaxing in Half Moon Bay, California, and much of the filming took place in the area surrounding the community. The film's under $10,000 budget was financed with his own income. Nguyen has cited The Birds and An Inconvenient Truth (2006) as inspiration for directing Birdemic.

During and since its release, Birdemic has become famously considered one of the worst films of all time. Birdemic was featured as a movie riffed on by the cast of RiffTrax both as a standalone product and during one of their live shows, drawing further attention to the film and Nguyen. In February 2012, Nguyen began production on a sequel to the film, entitled Birdemic 2: The Resurrection. The film was released in 2013 to negative reviews.

In a 2016 Vice interview, Nguyen said that he hoped to eventually make Birdemic 3: Sea Eagle, which would be his last film in the Birdemic series. Nguyen attempted to crowdfund for the film, first launching a project on Indiegogo which only raised $596 of its $500,000 goal and later on Kickstarter only raising $230 of its $200,000 goal. Despite this, it was announced in March 2021 that production on the third installment had begun with a planned release in late 2022. Birdemic 3 premiered at Fantastic Fest on September 25, 2022, and later released on streaming services on January 24, 2023.

Due to the gain in popularity with Birdemic's showing through RiffTrax, Nguyen agreed to allow RiffTrax to give a similar treatment to his unreleased Replica. The un-riffed version was available through RiffTrax in January 2017 and the riffed version was released on February 10, 2017.

== Filmography ==
Feature films

Year	Title	Director	Writer	Producer	Notes
2003	Julie and Jack	Yes	Yes	Yes	Also Director of Photography/Camera Operator/Lighting/Art Director/Costume Designer/Production Designer/Set Decorator/Songwriter - "Spiritual Love"/"Professor Tran"
2010	Birdemic: Shock and Terror	Yes	Yes	Executive	Also uncredited cameo as "Patron looking at menu"
2013	Birdemic 2: The Resurrection	Yes	Yes	No	Also cameo role as "Auteur Walking out of Vietnamese Restaurant"
2017	Replica	Yes	Yes	Yes	Shot in 2005; Also lighting and art director
2022	Birdemic 3: Sea Eagle	Yes	Yes	Yes	

Documentary short films

Year	Title	Director	Writer	Producer	Actor	Notes
2017	The Man with the Wooden Face	Yes	Yes	Yes	Yes	
2019	Cosmic Beauty	Yes	Yes	Yes	No	Also editor "Cosmic Beauty". letterboxd.com.
2023	Climate Fix	Yes	No	No	Yes	Also narrator
