= Birdemic 2: The Resurrection =

2013 film by James Nguyen

- Theatrical release poster
- Directed by: James Nguyen
- Written by: James Nguyen
- Produced by: Jeff Gross
- Starring: Alan Bagh; Whitney Moore; Patsy van Ettinger; Thomas Favaloro; Chelsea Turnbo; Brittany N. Pierce; Thuan Luu; Aaron Pressburg; Sam Hyde
- Cinematography: Bobby Hacker
- Edited by: Joe Pascual
- Music by: Michael Gordon Shapiro
- Production companies: Moviehead Pictures; I Got a Fish Productions
- Distributed by: Chill
- Release date: April 16, 2013
- Running time: 79 minutes
- Country: United States
- Language: English

Birdemic 2: The Resurrection is a 2013 American satirical romantic thriller-horror film written and directed by James Nguyen and produced by Jeff Gross. The sequel to Nguyen's 2010 film Birdemic: Shock and Terror, which has been considered one of the worst films of all time, Birdemic 2 features self-referential humor about the reception of the previous film. Taking place four years after the first Birdemic, the film follows another mass bird attack caused by global warming, this time in Hollywood.

== Plot ==
Four years after the events of the first film, Rod and Nathalie meet with the former's friend, Bill, an independent filmmaker, in order to fund his next movie, Sunset Dreams. Bill meets waitress and aspiring actress Gloria and proposes that she audition for the lead role in his film. He also watches the news reporting the mysterious deaths of multiple birds as well as blood rain. Eventually Gloria and Bill become romantically involved and Gloria gets the role she auditioned for. The group hangs out more often, during which they go to a museum with Tony, the boy Rod and Nathalie rescued and adopted, where it's revealed that his sister Susan died after eating the contaminated fish that Rod cooked. They meet Dr. Jones from the previous film, who states that prehistoric birds were known to attack early humans, and that many got stuck in the tar pit neighboring the museum.

The group vacations to a beach where a woman mysteriously gets attacked by a "giant jumbo jellyfish". They manage to save the woman and vacation to a resort where they see Nathalie's mother, and Bill and Gloria spend the night romantically. The next day however blood rain appears and resurrects countless birds from the tar pit as well as two cavemen. The group is attacked during filming but manages to escape along with a few crew members including screenwriter Will and actress Jessica. After a brief reunion with the tree hugger they escape to a theater but leave upon seeing birds. They head to a cemetery where they're attacked by zombies that kill Jessica. They also encounter and fight the two cavemen and settle at a hotel, where the birds attack again, killing Will. The birds then mysteriously leave a second time.

== Cast ==
- Alan Bagh as Rod
- Whitney Moore as Nathalie
- Patsy van Ettinger as Nathalie's mom
- Thomas Favaloro as Bill
- Chelsea Turnbo as Gloria
- Brittany N. Pierce as Jessica
- Thuan Luu as Will
- Aaron Pressburg as Dustin
- Damien Carter as himself
- Rick Camp as Dr. Jones
- Eric Swartz as Bill Stone
- Stephen Gustavson as Tree Hugger / Tom
- Carrie Stevens as Annie, tree hugger's wife
- Shaun Walker as Bevan Payne, tree hugger's son
- Colton Osborne as Tony
- Sam Hyde as Beach Goer 1
- Charls Carroll as Beach Goer 2
- Nick Rochefort as Beach Goer 3

== Production ==
Birdemic 2 was announced in April 2011, along with news that Bagh would reprise his role from the first film. Production began on February 4, 2012. Nguyen included long scenes of dancing in order to satisfy fans of his first film, who he said wanted romantic content; Nguyen himself sees the film as a romantic thriller. Nguyen was influenced by concerns about global warming, which he said was the cause of the bird and zombie attacks in the film. The film was shot in 3D, which Nguyen said he mastered during shooting. Shooting in 3D slowed down production, but Nguyen said he believed it would bring more people to the sequel.

== Release ==
A tie-in video game was released in October 2012. Starting on April 16, 2013, Chill.com exclusively offered the film via video on demand for 90 days before it was released to other services. It was released on DVD in October 2013.

== Reception ==
Dennis Harvey of Variety wrote, "Nguyen's partial self-awareness of his new movie's camp value ... only makes it an effortful, half-understood in-joke rather than the guiltily pleasurable unintentional joke that was Birdemic: Shock and Terror." Rod Lott of the Oklahoma Gazette wrote, "What keeps Birdemic 2 from reaching the first film's level of fun is Nguyen's penchant for treating this go-round like a greatest-hits reel." HorrorNews.net rated it 0/5 stars and called it the worst film of the year.

== Sequel ==
In a 2016 Vice interview, Nguyen said that he is hoping to eventually make Birdemic 3: Sea Eagle, which would be his last Birdemic film. In October 2016, an Indiegogo campaign was raised in order to finance the third film of the series. The funding was eventually closed, with only roughly $596 out of the desired $500,000 raised. Despite this, it was announced in March 2021 that production on the third installment had begun with a planned release in late 2022. The poster for the film was released on November 19, 2021 through Moviehead Pictures’ official Twitter page. The film itself premiered at Fantastic Fest on September 25, 2022, and was released on several streaming platforms on January 24, 2023. Birdemic 3: Sea Eagle grossed $758, and was only released theatrically in New Zealand.
