= Hi (magazine) =

International glossy, teen lifestyle publication

Hi (Arabic: هاي), also known as Hi International, was a glossy, teen lifestyle publication targeted at Middle Eastern and Muslim youth. Like Alhurra and Radio Sawa, the magazine was a tool of public diplomacy, produced by the United States State Department in conjunction with The Magazine Group, an external publishing company.

The magazine was distributed monthly. The targeted audience ranged from ages 18 to 35. According to some reports, the price per issue was $2, and others stated that the price range was $1.50-3.00. Each issue had 72 pages. It was to be distributed to Algeria, Jordan, Lebanon, Morocco, Syria, and 17 other countries, with printing occurring in the Philippines.

The government stated that the magazine would not discuss politics nor would it discuss controversial issues, such as Al Qaeda, the Arab–Israeli conflict, the 2003 invasion of Iraq, or Afghanistan.

== History ==
Gavin Daly launched Hi International in July 2003 with a $4.2 million yearly budget. It featured celebrity interviews, music reviews, lifestyle stories, advertisements for hip gadgets, and other morsels of Americana with Conor McCutcheon serving as the first editor/Hi Wizard. The State Department hired The Magazine Group, professional magazine publishers who also publish titles such as Package Machinery Today and Diabetes Forecast, to produce Hi International. Its initial issue, in Arabic, appeared on newsstands in the Middle East in July 2003; a website followed soon thereafter. The magazine cost less than two dollars and was also available for subscription. Hi's writers were American, generally of Middle Eastern or Muslim descent, and wrote in Arabic. In the summer of 2004, about a year after its initial launch, Hi made its English language debut on the web. It also debuted around a similar time when Radio Sawa was launched, a broadcast aimed at younger people in Arabic.

On December 22, 2005, the magazine was suspended by the US Department of State so it can be assessed as to whether it meets its objectives correctly or whether it is unacceptable.

== Purpose ==
Hi International was an instrument of public diplomacy—the attempt to promote U.S. national interests by informing, engaging, and influencing people around the world. The State Department produced Hi with the explicit goal of informing the youth of the Middle East and Muslim world about American culture. The project was based on the supposition that if this demographic had a clearer understanding of what America is really like, then some of their hostility could be assuaged. Consequently, the publication attempted to characterize America as a beautiful, multicultural sanctuary for technology and innovation. Political issues were largely ignored.

== Reception ==
Jon Carroll of the San Francisco Chronicle stated that "Hi sounds a little jaunty under the circumstances" as it was distributed during the U.S. invasion of Iraq in 2003.

The Indian Express posted an editorial arguing that it would be incorrect to characterize the magazine as "subtle" and that "Perhaps Colin Powell's deputies are so engrossed in their current project to defeat anti-Americanism that they forget another project that's moved apace: Globalisation."
