= USS Bergall (SS-320) =

Balao-class submarine in service 1944-1958

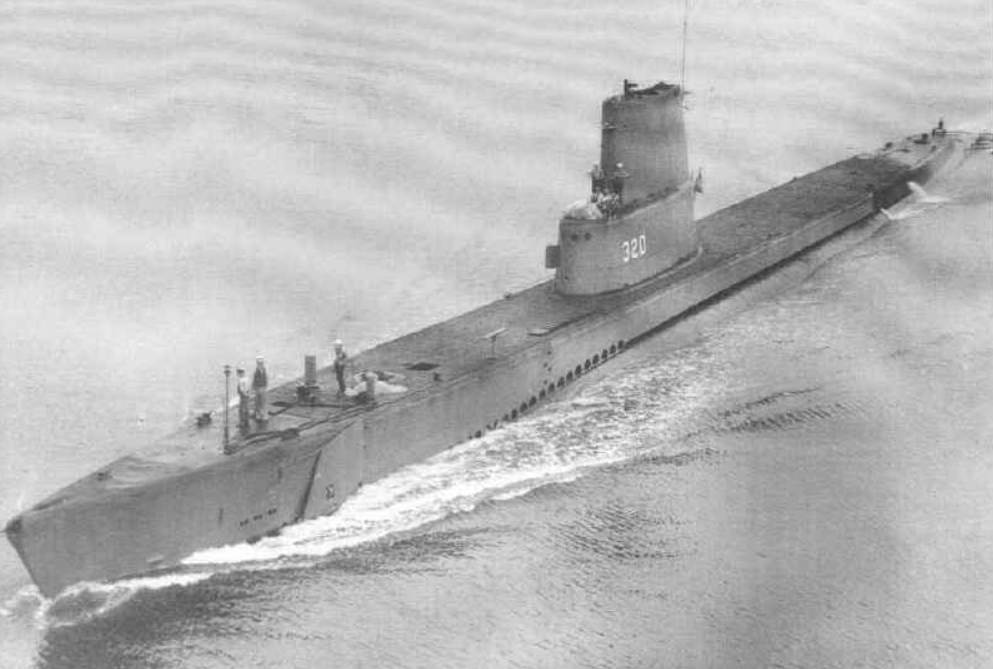
- USS Bergall (SS-320) in 1950.

History

United States
- Name: USS Bergall (SS-320)
- Namesake: Bergall
- Builder: Electric Boat Company, Groton, Connecticut
- Laid down: 13 May 1943
- Launched: 16 February 1944
- Commissioned: 12 June 1944
- Decommissioned: 17 October 1958
- Stricken: 1 February 1973
- Fate: Transferred to Turkey 18 October 1958; Sold to Turkey 15 February 1973

Turkey
- Name: TCG Turgutreis (S 342)
- Namesake: Dragut (1485–1565), in Turkish "Turgutreis" or "Turgut Reis," Ottoman corsair, naval commander, governor, and pasha
- Acquired: 17 October 1958
- Decommissioned: 5 April 1983
- Renamed: Ceryan Botu-6
- In service: 1983 (non-commissioned)
- Out of service: 1996 (non-commissioned)
- Fate: Sold for scrap April 2000
- Notes: Served as battery-charging hulk 1983–1996

General characteristics
- Class & type: Balao-class diesel-electric submarine
- Displacement: 1,526 tons (1,550 t) surfaced; 2,424 tons (2,460 t) submerged
- Length: 311 ft 9 in (95.02 m)
- Beam: 27 ft 3 in (8.31 m)
- Draft: 16 ft 10 in (5.13 m) maximum
- Propulsion: 4 × General Motors Model 16-278A V16 diesel engines driving electrical generators; 2 × 126-cell Sargo batteries; 4 × high-speed General Electric electric motors with reduction gears; 2 × propellers; 5,400 shp (4.0 MW) surfaced; 2,740 shp (2.0 MW) submerged
- Speed: 20.25 knots (37 km/h) surfaced; 8.75 knots (16 km/h) submerged
- Range: 11,000 nm (20,000 km) surfaced at 10 knots (19 km/h)
- Endurance: 48 hours at 2 knots (4 km/h) submerged; 75 days on patrol
- Test depth: 400 ft (120 m)
- Complement: 10 officers, 70–71 enlisted
- Armament: 10 × 21-inch (533 mm) torpedo tubes; 6 forward, 4 aft; 24 torpedoes; 1 × 5-inch (127 mm) / 25 caliber deck gun; Bofors 40 mm and Oerlikon 20 mm cannon

USS Bergall (SS-320), a Balao-class submarine in commission from 1944 to 1958, was the first ship of the United States Navy to be named for the bergall, a small fish of the New England coast. During World War II she made five war patrols between 8 September 1944 and 17 June 1945, operating in the South China Sea, Java Sea, and Lombok Strait and north of the Malay Barrier. During these patrols she sank two Japanese merchant ships totaling 14,710 gross register tons and one 740-displacement ton Imperial Japanese Navy frigate. She also damaged the Japanese heavy cruiser Myōkō, which was never repaired.

After World War II, Bergall served in the United States Pacific Fleet until 1950 and made a cruise in Alaskan waters and a deployment to the Far East. She transferred to the United States Atlantic Fleet in 1950 and made cruises along the east coast of North America and to the West Indies, as well as two deployments to the Mediterranean Sea for service in the United States Sixth Fleet.

When Bergall′s U.S. Navy career ended, she was transferred to Turkey in 1958 and was commissioned in the Turkish Naval Forces as TCG Turgutreis (S 342). She took part in the Turkish invasion of Cyprus in 1974. She was decommissioned in 1983 and sold for scrap in April 2000.

== Construction and commissioning ==
Bergall′s keel was laid down on 13 May 1943 by the Electric Boat Company in Groton, Connecticut. She was launched on 16 February 1944, sponsored by Mrs. Isabel M. Elkins, and commissioned on 12 June 1944 with Lieutenant Commander John M. Hyde in command.

== Operational history ==
=== United States Navy ===
==== World War II ====
===== June–September 1944 =====
Bergall carried out shakedown operations in the waters off New London, Connecticut, and attack training at the torpedo range near Newport, Rhode Island, until 3 July 1944. After returning to Naval Submarine Base New London at Groton, Bergall departed for the war in the Pacific on 16 July 1944. During her voyage to the Panama Canal Zone, she was near Puerto Rico when a United States Army Air Forces training plane crashed into the sea about 1,000 yards (910 m) away. She rescued the plane's crewmen, who were uninjured, and took them to the Panama Canal Zone. After transiting the Panama Canal on 24 July 1944, she departed Balboa, Panama Canal Zone, on 28 July 1944 and arrived at Pearl Harbor, Hawaii, on 13 August 1944.

After arriving at Pearl Harbor, Bergall engaged in two weeks of crew training, firing nine torpedoes and taking part in a convoy exercise. She also entered drydock to replace a squeaky load-bearing strut before preparing for her first war patrol.

===== First war patrol =====
Departing Pearl Harbor on 8 September 1944 to begin her first war patrol, Bergall proceeded to the Mariana Islands, mooring alongside the submarine tender USS Holland (AS-3) in Tanapag Harbor at Saipan on 19 September. On 20 September 1944, she headed west into the Philippine Sea.

On 22 September 1944, Bergall′s bridge crew sighted another submarine, which dived shortly thereafter. After clearing the area, Bergall radioed a contact report. While endeavoring to send a follow-up message on 23 September, Bergall had to submerge quickly when a Japanese Yokosuka P1Y (Allied reporting name "Frances") twin-engined bomber approached and dropped a depth charge on her wake. As Bergall worked toward her assigned patrol station in the South China Sea off Japanese-occupied French Indochina, four more Japanese planes harassed her progress, delaying her arrival off Cap Varella until 29 September 1944.

After allowing five small ships to pass by, Bergall battle-surfaced on 3 October 1944 in an attempt to sink a 150-gross register ton Japanese cargo ship with gunfire. She surfaced at long range, about 3,500 yards (3,200 m) away, and her gunners opened fire with 5-inch (127 mm) and 40-millimeter guns. The cargo ship took at least one 5-inch (127 mm) hit and immediately turned for the coast. Bergall′s attack was cut short when a Mitsubishi F1M2 (Allied reporting name "Pete") observation floatplane arrived on the scene and forced Bergall to submerge.

For the next five days, Bergall unsuccessfully patrolled the offshore shipping lanes before closing Phan Rang Bay on 8 October 1944. On 9 October, she sighted a 700-gross register ton Japanese cargo ship and fired three torpedoes, the first of which hit and completely demolished the ship. A postwar records review did not indicate any Japanese losses in the area, however, and Bergall did not receive credit for the sinking.

While operating close inshore on the morning of 13 October 1944, Bergall sighted what she identified as two Japanese cargo ships (one she estimated at 2,000 gross register tons and the other at about 1,000 gross register tons) farther offshore and accompanied by two small escorts. After maneuvering to seaward, she fired four torpedoes at the larger ship from a range of about 2,000 yards (1,800 m). At that point, one of the escorts began to close Bergall rapidly. Bergall turned sharply, dived, and headed out to sea. Her crew heard two loud explosions and breaking-up noises, signifying the end of what turned out to be Shinshu Maru, a 4,182-gross register ton tanker. Over the next five hours, Japanese forces tried to retaliate, dropping 30 depth charges and four aircraft bombs in an unsuccessful attempt to sink Bergall. The patrol vessel No. 7 Taiwan Maru picked up ten of Shinshu Maru′s survivors

Bergall then moved farther south, cruising along a patrol line near Saigon until 24 October 1944. She then received orders to patrol the Balabac Strait near Palawan in the Philippine Islands. On 27 October 1944, while conducting a night patrol on the surface, Bergall picked up four ships on her radar. She closed rapidly and at a range of 3,500 yards (3,200 m) fired six torpedoes at a very large tanker, the 10,528-gross register ton Nippo Maru. Shortly thereafter, multiple explosions accompanied by a large sheet of flame indicated four hits. A cargo ship in Nippo Maru′s convoy fled into shoal water to avoid attack, and Bergall withdrew into Balabac Strait. Twenty minutes later, Nippo Maru disappeared from Bergall′s radar screen, marking her demise.

On 28 October 1944, Bergall cruised south along the coast of Sarawak, and she passed through the Karimata Strait on 1 November 1944. On 2 November, off the southern coast of Borneo, she came across a small sailboat loaded with cargo. After Bergall stopped to investigate, the sailboat's native crew leapt into the water on the opposite side of the sailboat. Bergall opened fire on the sailboat with her 20-millimeter and 40-millimeter guns, destroying it. She then continued south, passed through the Lombok Strait. and concluded her patrol with her arrival at Fremantle, Australia, on 8 November 1944.

===== Second war patrol =====
After a refit and drydocking in the auxiliary repair dock USS ARD-10, Bergall got underway from Fremantle to begin her second war patrol on 5 December 1944. She passed through Lombok Strait late on 8 December and cleared Karimata Strait on 11 December.

On the evening of 13 December 1944, while patrolling in darkness off the southern tip of French Indochina, Bergall sighted two Japanese warships — the heavy cruiser Myōkō and destroyer Ushio — moving away from her at 13 knots (24 km/h; 15 mph). She pursued them on the surface and, after slowly gaining ground for three hours, closed the range to 3,300 yards (3,000 m). Very shallow water forced her to make an attack on the surface. At 20:37 she fired six torpedoes at Myōkō and turned away. Three minutes later, a terrific explosion rocked Myōkō, producing an immense sheet of flame that reached at least 750 feet (230 m) into the air. As Ushio stopped to assist Myōkō, Bergall lurked nearby on the surface, planning to fire a salvo of torpedoes at her if given the opportunity. At 21:00, however, as Bergall maneuvered closer, Myōkō fired two shells at Bergall with the help of her Type 22 radar. One landed in her wake close astern and the other, an 8-inch (203 mm) round, pierced Bergall′s forward loading hatch, tearing a large hole in her pressure hull but failing to explode. Evading two more salvoes, Bergall cleared the area with alacrity.

Bergall′s crew, believing they had sunk Myōkō, spent the rest of 13 December 1944 extinguishing electrical fires, cleaning up the debris caused by the shell hit, and stuffing the ruined hatch with mattresses to keep out sea spray. With Bergall unable to dive, her crew mounted all available guns and stood by to repel air attack on the morning of 14 December. After reporting her predicament, she received orders to rendezvous with the submarine USS Angler (SS-240), after which her crew was to transfer to Angler and Angler was to scuttle Bergall with torpedoes. After rendezvousing with Angler on 15 December 1944, however, Bergall′s commanding officer, Commander John Hyde and Executive Lieutenant Commander, Robert L. Ison, noting an absence of Japanese aircraft and a heavily overcast sky, decided to bring Bergall back to port on the surface and set course for Australia. The two submarines traveled nearly 2,000 nautical miles (3,700 km; 2,300 mi) without incident, arriving at Exmouth Gulf on the coast of Western Australia safely on 20 December 1944.

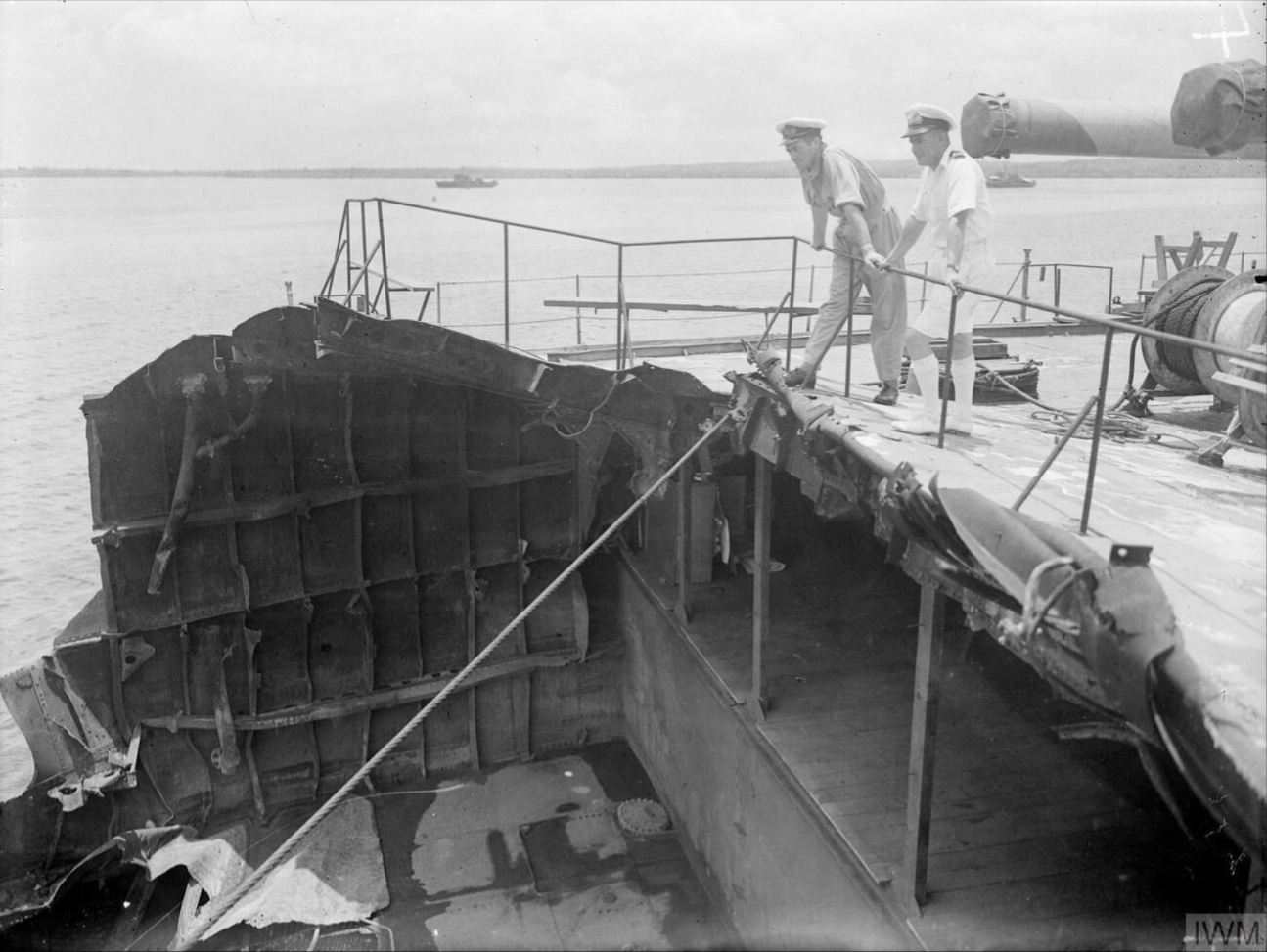
Two British naval officers examine what is left of the Japanese heavy cruiser Myōkō's stern at Singapore on 25 September 1945.

Myōkō, meanwhile, battled the damage Bergall′s torpedoes had inflicted on her. Her crew managed to extinguish persistent fires on 15 December 1944 and rig a towline that same day. Over the next 10 days, Myōkō and the eight ships sent to help her fought stormy weather in the South China Sea in a desperate attempt to reach port. On 25 December 1944, despite severe weather that tore her damaged stern away, Myōkō limped into Singapore, denying Bergall a complete kill. However, Myōkō was never repaired, and remained at Singapore until she surrendered to Allied forces at the end of the war. Bergall received a Navy Unit Commendation for the night action of 13 December 1944.

===== Third war patrol =====
Repairs to Bergall′s pressure hull were completed in early January 1945, after which her crew conducted four days of training with new Mark 27 acoustic homing torpedoes. She got underway for her third war patrol on 19 January 1945 and commenced lifeguard duty in support of Allied airstrikes off Lombok Strait on 26 January. At 03:05 on 27 January, she picked up what she identified as an approaching Japanese patrol boat on her radar and took up a submerged attack position at a depth of 200 feet (61 m). She flooded a forward torpedo tube and, when sound bearings indicated the range had closed to 600 yards (550 m), fired one of her Mark 27 torpedoes at the patrol boat. A few minutes later, the crew heard one explosion, and the patrol boat slowly disappeared from Bergall′s radar screen. At daybreak, Bergall came across wreckage and a drifting lifeboat. Her crew picked up two prisoners and from them learned that Bergall had sunk a 174-displacement ton coastal minesweeper.

Bergall continued lifeguard duty in Lombok Strait, dodging ship and aircraft contacts over the next several days. On 29 January 1945 she fired another acoustic homing torpedo at a patrol boat, but this one missed. After several more days of fruitless patrolling, she rendezvoused with the submarine USS Bluegill (SS-242) off Borneo, transferred the prisoners-of-war to Bluegill, and then continued west to the coast of French Indochina.

On 7 February 1945, while submerged off Hannai Point, Bergall sighted the Japanese convoy HI-93 off Vân Phong Bay, identifying it as consisting of two tankers guarded by four large escorts. Despite the twin dangers of a smooth and glassy sea and shallow water, she closed to attack. At about 09:36, she fired six torpedoes and minutes later heard three hits, but did not see the results of the hits because a nearby escort spotted the wakes of her torpedoes and bore down on her at once. The Japanese escorts started dropping depth charges almost immediately, with the seventh salvo coming very close. Bergall missed with the lone acoustic homing torpedo she fired in self-defense, and repeated depth-charge attacks pinned her down for the next three hours. Although she scraped bottom several times, the shallow water might actually have saved her, because many of the Japanese depth charges did not explode, presumably because they hit the ocean bottom before reaching their depth settings. Surfacing that evening, Bergall learned from the nearby submarine USS Flounder (SS-251) that the Japanese escorts had been driven off by a U.S. Navy PB4Y-1 Liberator patrol bomber. A postwar review of Japanese records indicated that Bergall had damaged the transport Toho Maru and sunk the 800-displacement ton Type C escort ship CD-53.

Bergall remained in her patrol area until 12 February 1945, when she received orders to rendezvous with the submarines USS Guitarro (SS-363) and USS Blower (SS-325) to form a coordinated attack group. She rendezvoused with Guitarro later that day, and Blower joined the pair early on 13 February. After that, the trio took up a patrol station off Cape Batagan, French Indochina. In spite of frequent dives to avoid Japanese aircraft, Bergall spotted a Japanese surface force composed of two battleships, a cruiser, and three destroyers just after 12:00 on 13 February. She closed to 4,800 yards (4,400 m) and fired six torpedoes before diving to escape. Less than ten minutes later, the first of 15 Japanese depth charges dropped near her firing position. She shook violently but suffered only minor damage. While she was submerged, her crew heard three explosions, signs that the other two American submarines were in on the attack. Records reviewed after the war, however, indicated that the Japanese warships suffered no damage. On 14 February, Bergall proceeded to Subic Bay on the coast of Luzon in the Philippine Islands for a refit, arriving there on 17 February 1945 and concluding her patrol.

===== Fourth war patrol =====
Following two weeks of repairs alongside the submarine tender USS Griffin (AS-13), Bergall put to sea early in March 1945 for her fourth war patrol. In company with Blueback and the submarine USS Blenny (SS-324), Bergall proceeded to the coast of French Indochina and took up a lifeguard station off Cape Varella on 7 March 1945. She stayed there, battling rough seas and dodging packs of fishing boats, until 15 March, when she headed north to rescue four American aviators spotted in a life raft. The Japanese gave Bergall′s crew several bad starts during this period, including one during which Japanese escorts randomly dropped depth charges nearby and two others in which Japanese submarines fired torpedoes at her.

Bergall moved to a position off Java on 8 April 1945, but more frequent Japanese air patrols forced her to submerge almost every day. Finally, she left the area for Australia on 14 April, arriving at Freemantle on 17 April 1945 to complete her patrol. She then underwent a refit in drydock which included a hull cleaning and repairs to a rudder that vibrated excessively and which brought her a new surface search radar as well as one 40-millimeter and two 20-millimeter guns. After that, she conducted sound survey and training maneuvers.

===== Fifth war patrol =====
Bergall got underway on her fifth war patrol on 12 May 1945. She cleared Lombok Strait on the morning of 18 May and turned west, passing south of Kangean Island. At 07:25, lookouts spotted a small Japanese coastal cargo ship creeping out of a nearby bay. Unwilling to waste a torpedo on such a small target or to put the 5-inch (127 mm) gun crew at the risk of air attack, she closed rapidly on the surface and opened fire with both 40-millimeter guns. A dozen hits started a fire, and the cargo ship's crew began abandoning ship. Just then, however, a Japanese plane approached, and Bergall submerged to avoid a counterattack. The damaged Japanese cargo ship escaped into Gedah Bay under this protective air cover.

Bergall proceeded through the Java Sea and took up a patrol position astride the Japanese convoy routes heading north from Singapore. Joined there by the submarines USS Bullhead (SS-332), USS Hawkbill (SS-366), USS Kraken (SS-370), and USS Cobia (SS-245), she patrolled in the South China Sea off the coast of French Indochina. She also scouted the South China Sea during the Allied landings at Tarakan on Borneo. After a number of false contacts, she finally spotted a small Japanese convoy of five barges and two tugs in the early morning hours of 30 May 1945. The tugs tried to slip their tows and escape, but their maximum speed of 8 knots (15 km/h; 9.2 mph) meant that Bergall easily closed with them, and her gun crews sank both tugs and all five barges.

Bergall then searched the coast of the Malayan Peninsula, spotting a four-ship convoy deep in the Gulf of Thailand on 12 June 1945. Because of the shallow water, she moved ahead of the convoy to find a better attack position but was forced to submerge when a Japanese floatplane appeared overhead. She surfaced that evening and headed north along the coast in search of the convoy. Just after midnight on 13 June 1945, when she was near the Kra Isthmus, a powerful explosion to port — probably either a magnetic influence mine or a remotely controlled mine — severely rocked her. The blast knocked out power to her motors, sheared numerous bolts in the machinery room, and jammed her rudder hard to port. A strange smell briefly led to fears of a chlorine gas leak, but her crew soon traced the smell to a broken vinegar jug in Bergall′s galley whose smell had spread via her ventilation system.

Following temporary repairs, Bergall got way on, but the shock damage left her reduction gear noisy and full of asymmetrical vibrations. Unable to attack Japanese ships successfully in this condition, she turned north for Subic Bay, arriving there on 17 June 1945, bringing her fifth war patrol to an end.

===== June–August 1945 =====
Ordered back to the United States for more extensive repairs, Bergall departed Subic Bay on 20 June 1945. She stopped at Pearl Harbor from 8 to 11 July, and passed through the Panama Canal on 27 July 1945. She arrived at Portsmouth Navy Yard in Kittery, Maine, on 4 August 1945 to begin a four-month overhaul. World War II ended while she was there with the cessation of hostilities with Japan on 15 August 1945.

==== Post-World War II ====
===== 1945–1949 =====
Upon completion of her repairs and overhaul, Bergall got underway from Kittery on 1 December 1945. She conducted a series of post-overhaul training exercises before passing through the Panama Canal and reporting for duty with the United States Pacific Fleet at Pearl Harbor on 18 December 1945. Assigned to Submarine Squadron 1, Bergall spent the next year, aside from one cruise to Guam in the Mariana Islands and back, operating locally in Hawaiian waters. In November 1946, she received another overhaul, which included the installation of a new surface search radar.

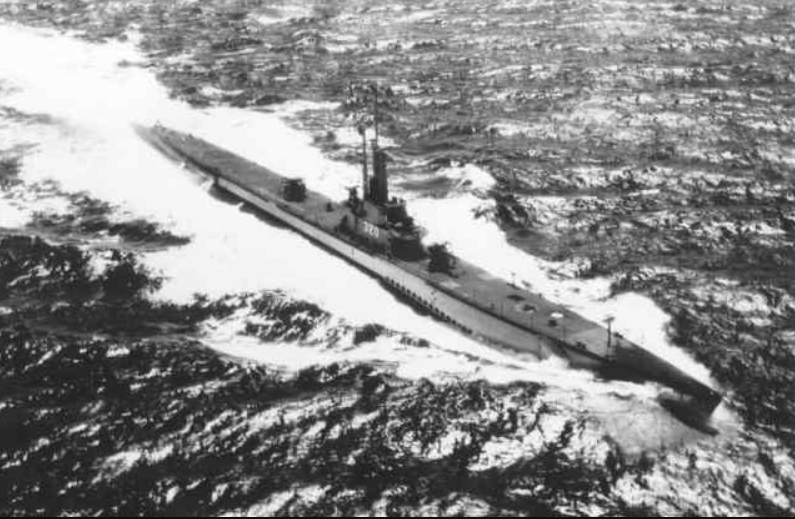
USS Bergall (SS-320) in 1947.

In light of the growing tensions between the United States and the Soviet Union as the Cold War began, emphasized by President Harry S. Truman's 12 March 1947 message to the United States Congress articulating American willingness to provide military aid to countries threatened by communism, the U.S. Navy began planning for a possible confrontation with the Soviet Union. One of the training measures devised to give submarine crews experience in case of such a conflict was the "simulated war patrol," a mission upon which Bergall embarked in April 1947. Underway from Pearl Harbor on 1 April 1947, she headed north for a patrol in the Bering Sea. She ran into snow squalls on 8 April before arriving at Adak in the Aleutian Islands on 10 April. After a brief stop at Attu in the Aleutians on 14 April, she practiced maneuvers in the Bering Sea in late April. She conducted target practice against the Arctic ice pack on 20 April 1947 and carried out a reconnaissance exercise near the Pribilof Islands on 23 April. She proceeded to Dutch Harbor on Amaknak Island in the Aleutians on 25 April 1947, then moved on to Kodiak on Kodiak Island, arriving there on 28 April. She then took part in antisubmarine warfare training with U.S. Navy Patrol Squadron 10 (VP-10) in early May 1947 before turning south to arrive at Seattle, Washington, on 14 May. There, Bergall conducted several United States Naval Reserve training dives, a few more antisubmarine warfare exercises with aircraft, this time with planes from Naval Air Station Whidbey Island on Whidbey Island, and opened ship for visitors while in Lake Washington on 23 May 1947. Following another Naval Reserve training cruise on 31 May, she headed back to Pearl Harbor, mooring there on 8 June 1947.

Later in the summer of 1947, Bergall put to sea in company with the submarines USS Brill (SS-330) and USS Bugara (SS-331) for a coordinated attack exercise against the battleship USS Iowa (BB-61) in the Hawaiian Islands. Taking up a position in the Alenuihaha Channel, the submarines attempted to intercept the battleship as she made a high-speed run between Maui and the island of Hawaii. Although Iowa enjoyed land-based air cover and tried to throw off her pursuers by several radical course changes, the submarines still achieved four "successful" mock attacks against the battleship, including one by Bergall from a range of only 950 yards (870 m).

Bergall remained in Hawaiian waters, save for a single voyage to San Diego, California, for the Navy Day celebrations in November 1947, until 14 May 1948. On that day, she proceeded to San Francisco, California, where she entered the Mare Island Naval Shipyard on Mare Island in Vallejo, California, on 7 June 1948 for a four-month overhaul. She received new batteries, a new sonar suite, and a motor overhaul before leaving California on 21 October 1948 and arriving at Pearl Harbor on 29 October 1948.

In preparation for experiments to be conducted during her second simulated war patrol, Bergall took on board two scientists from Columbia University and installed gravimetry equipment inside her. Underway from Pearl Harbor on 3 December 1948, Bergall slowly proceeded southwest, diving at 50-nautical-mile (93 km; 58 mi) intervals to take underwater gravity measurements. She crossed the equator on 9 December 1948 near the Gilbert Islands and moored at Brisbane, Australia, on 20 December. On 27 December, she headed north toward Guam, and after taking more measurements every 50 nautical miles (93 km; 58 mi), she arrived in Apra Harbor on Guam on 7 January 1949. After disembarking the scientists and unloading their equipment, Bergall commenced two weeks of shore bombardment and antisubmarine exercises, including a mission against the light cruiser USS Astoria (CL-90) and the destroyers USS James E. Kyes (DD-787) and USS Shelton (DD-790) in and around the Mariana Islands.

Departing for Japan on 20 January 1949, Bergall conducted more antisubmarine warfare exercises from Sasebo, Japan, and in the waters off Okinawa. She also provided target services to United States Seventh Fleet land-based patrol aircraft. During these exercises, her crew discovered that, at least during calm weather, patrol planes could drop sonobuoys near her and vector in supporting destroyers, who successfully "pinned down" the submarine. In rougher weather, swirling water smothered the passive sonobuoys with white noise and the submarine always escaped.

Bergall departed Okinawa on 15 February 1949 and, after a brief refueling stop at Midway Atoll in the Northwestern Hawaiian Islands, she returned to Pearl Harbor on 28 February 1949. She then conducted local operations in Hawaiian waters until May 1950.

===== 1950–1958 =====
On 6 May 1950, Bergall got underway from Pearl Harbor bound foir the United States East Coast. She passed through the Panama Canal on 1 July 1950 and arrived at Naval Submarine Base New London in Groton, Connecticut, on 11 July. There, she was assigned to the Operational Development Force and soon began doctrinal and experimental exercises with United States Atlantic Fleet forces. In addition to local exercises, she conducted several training cruises up and down the U.S. East Coast. In September 1950, she visited Bridgeport, Connecticut, and Brooklyn, New York. On 6 June 1951, she embarked on a training cruise to the West Indies, visiting Guantanamo Bay Naval Base and Havana in Cuba and Port-au-Prince in Haiti before returning to New London on 10 July 1951.

In August 1951, Bergall loaded 42 Mark 10 drill mines and, on 15 August, conducted a submerged minelaying exercise in Block Island Sound off Rhode Island. She then remained at New London until 8 November 1951, when she proceeded to the Philadelphia Naval Shipyard on League Island in Philadelphia, Pennsylvania, to commence a Fleet Snorkel Program conversion. There, between 9 November 1951 and 9 April 1952, shipyard workers installed a new streamlined sail and the air intake and exhaust tubes of the submarine snorkel system, allowing Bergall to operate her diesel engines while submerged at periscope depth.

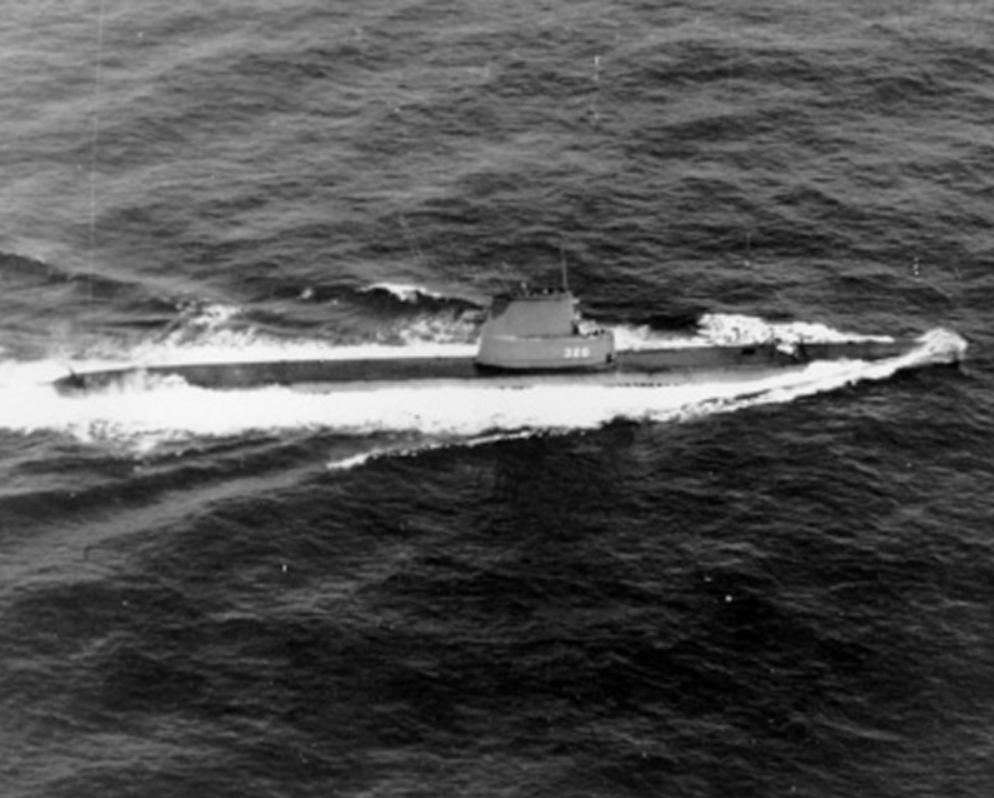
USS Bergall (SS-320) in 1953.

Over the next two years, Bergall operated locally from New London and conducted two training cruises to the West Indies, where she visited the Bahamas, Cuba, and Key West, Florida. She also held three more minelaying exercises in Rhode Island Sound off Rhode Island, demonstrating the advantages of a snorkel-equipped submarine for minelaying operations. In addition, she participated in antisubmarine warfare training with surface ships and planes. During one such exercise, on the evening of 31 October 1954, the destroyer USS Norris (DD-859) accidentally ran over Bergall while Bergall was conducting a simulated torpedo attack, smashing in Bergall′s sail, crushing her radar mast and snorkel head, and tearing out wiring and piping. As her pressure hull survived intact, she proceeded to the Philadelphia Naval Shipyard for repairs. After this work was completed, Bergall resumed her familiar routine of development exercises from New London on 16 December 1954.

===== 1955–1958 =====
As part of her routine operations, Bergall conducted a training cruise to Puerto Rico and Jamaica in January 1955, a minelaying exercise off Block Island off the coast of Rhode Island in March 1955, and tests with the Underwater Sound Laboratory at Bermuda in June 1955. Later that summer, the submarine began preparations for an overseas deployment with the United States Sixth Fleet in the Mediterranean Sea.

Underway from New London on 9 November 1955, Bergall crossed the Atlantic Ocean and arrived at Lisbon, Portugal, on 20 November 1955. After a short visit, she passed through the Strait of Gibraltar and proceeded to Nice, France, where she arrived on 26 November 1955. Over the next six weeks, in between various antisubmarine warfare exercises with units of the Sixth Fleet, she visited ports in Italy and Spain and familiarized herself with the waters of the western Mediterranean. She returned to New London on 28 January 1956.

In addition to her usual routine from New London, Bergall provided target services for the Sound School at Port Everglades, Florida, in May 1956, visited Halifax, Canada, in June 1956, and conducted more development exercises at Bermuda in August 1956. On 21 October 1956, she reported to the Portsmouth Naval Shipyard in Kittery, Maine, for an overhaul. While she was there, shipyard workers installed new sonar and sonar-related equipment.

Underway for her post-overhaul shakedown cruise on 7 June 1957, Bergall headed south to Fort Lauderdale, Florida, for two weeks of operations and target services before returning to New London. In early July 1957 she turned south again, this time providing services to the Underwater Sound Laboratory at Bermuda. After she returned to New London on 22 July 1957, her crew carried out routine maintenance and other preparations for Bergall′s second cruise to the Mediterranean.

Departing New London on 31 August 1957, Bergall headed northeast across the Atlantic Ocean, arriving in Rothesay, Scotland, on 13 September 1957. On 23 September, she turned south and, after a brief refueling stop at Portland, England, passed through the Strait of Gibraltar on 7 October 1957. She spent the next seven weeks in the Mediterranean, conducting operations with units of the Sixth Fleet at sea and visiting Piraeus and Patras in Greece, Valletta in Malta, and Catania and Naples in Italy. She turned for home on 23 November 1957, arriving at New London on 7 December 1957.

After a cruise to Bermuda and back between 1 and 8 February 1958, Bergall commenced a longer training cruise to the West Indies on 26 February 1958. She conducted antisubmarine warfare exercises from San Juan, Puerto Rico, and St. Thomas in the United States Virgin Islands until returning to New London on 28 March 1958. Other than a port visit to Halifax, Nova Scotia, in early May 1958, she remained in port until 14 July 1958, when she headed south to Key West, arriving here on the 20 July. There, her batteries were replaced, and the crew prepared her for transfer to Turkey under the Military Assistance Program.

Departing Key West on 26 September 1958, Bergall crossed the Atlantic Ocean, entered the Mediterranean Sea on 9 October 1958, and arrived in İzmir, Turkey, on 15 October 1958. She was decommissioned at İzmir on 17 October 1958.

==== Honors and awards ====
- Navy Unit Commendation for action of 13 December 1944
- Asiatic-Pacific Campaign Medal with four battle stars for World War II service
- World War II Victory Medal
- Navy Occupation Service Medal with "ASIA" clasp
- China Service Medal

=== Turkish Naval Forces ===
The submarine was transferred, on loan, to Turkey on the day of her decommissioning, 17 October 1958. She immediately was commissioned in the Turkish Naval Forces as TCG Turgutreis (S342), named for Dragut (1485–1565), known in Turkish as "Turgutreis" or "Turgut Reis," an Ottoman corsair, governor, and pasha and Ottoman Navy commander. In the United States, she officially lost the name Bergall on 22 March 1965, when it was reassigned to the new submarine USS Bergall (SSN-667). After she had served on loan to the Turkish Navy for almost 15 years, she was struck from the U.S. Naval Vessel Register on 1 February 1973, and she was sold to Turkey on 15 February 1973.

In 1974, Turgutreis visited the Philadelphia Naval Shipyard and took part in the Turkish invasion of Cyprus, known to Turkish speakers as the "Cyprus Operation" or "Cyprus Peace Operation." She was decommissioned on 5 April 1983. She then was renamed TCG Ceryan Botu-6 and served as a receiving ship, yard craft, and battery-charging hulk for other submarines at Gölcük Navy Yard in Gölcük, Turkey until 1996. She was sold for scrap in April 2000.

== In media ==
Bergall is the subject of two episodes of the American syndicated television anthology series The Silent Service, which aired during 1957 and 1958.
