= Big Shark =

2023 American adventure film by Tommy Wiseau

- Official release poster
- Directed by: Tommy Wiseau
- Written by: Tommy Wiseau
- Produced by: Thomas Johnston; Isaiah LaBorde; Tommy Wiseau
- Starring: Tommy Wiseau; Isaiah LaBorde; Mark Valeriano
- Cinematography: Cassiano Pereira; Christoph Schultz
- Edited by: Hunter Thomas
- Production company: Wiseau-Films
- Distributed by: Wiseau-Films
- Release dates: April 2, 2023 (Pre-premiere); March 16, 2024 (final cut)
- Running time: 105 minutes
- Country: United States
- Language: English
- Box office: $30,157

Big Shark is a 2023 American adventure comedy action film written, directed and produced by Tommy Wiseau, and starring Wiseau, Isaiah LaBorde and Mark Valeriano as three firefighters who must save New Orleans from a killer shark.

The film had its world pre-premiere on April 2, 2023, at Cinema 21 in Portland, Oregon, and was taken on a limited US roadshow to New Orleans, San Francisco, Los Angeles, San Diego and New York City, and internationally to London, UK. The film had its official final cut world premiere on March 16, 2024, at Cinema 21 in Portland, Oregon.

== Plot ==
Patrick, Tim, and Georgie are firefighters who live and work together. After saving two children from a fire, they are hailed as heroes of New Orleans.

While on a fishing trip with his girlfriend Sophia, Patrick claims to witness a 35-foot long shark. Although he repeatedly tries to warn his friends, they do not believe him and insist there are no sharks in the Mississippi River.

Eventually, Patrick is vindicated when shark attacks are reported on the local news. The shark is carried abreast of flood water through the streets of the city, eating people. Patrick and Tim set out across New Orleans to save the city from the shark, and scenes in which they search for or flee from it are interspersed with scenes of interactions with their girlfriends and socializing at a bar.

Meanwhile, their boss, Captain Joe, procures scuba gear for them and implores them to help save the city. Tim receives a treasure map from an old man in the bar, marking where the shark sleeps, though Patrick expresses some confusion over whether or not sharks sleep.

While playing pool, Patrick and Tim conceive a plan to place a tracking device on the shark, follow it in their scuba gear, and feed it dynamite hidden inside a pig carcass.

After obtaining the bait, they spear the shark with the tracking device, but the animal retaliates and eats Georgie. Tim and Patrick visit a shrine erected in Georgie's honor on the beach, and together mourn their friend's death by composing a song.

With the tracking device in place, Tim and Patrick pursue the shark into the bayou and kill it by tricking it into eating the bomb. Initially, Tim seems to die in the explosion, but it is revealed that he was only flung high in the air and survives. The heroes celebrate by dancing in the streets of New Orleans with a marching band.

== Cast ==
- Tommy Wiseau as Patrick
- Isaiah LaBorde as Tim
- Mark Valeriano as Georgie
- Ashton Leigh as Sophia
- Erica Mary Gillheeney as Charlotte
- Greg Sestero as Georgie (Note: Sestero was originally slated to appear as one of the leads in the film alongside LaBorde and Wiseau. In the 2019 teaser trailer, he appears as Georgie. However, by 2023 the role was recast, with Valeriano appearing in new promotional material and Sestero does not appear in the final film, although he still is credited)

== Production ==
Tommy Wiseau, who used to live in Louisiana, related that he was inspired to create Big Shark following the flooding of New Orleans caused by Hurricane Katrina in 2005.

The first trailer for the film was produced over two weeks in February under director of photography Matt S. Bell, from a total of two days of filming in Lafayette, Louisiana, and screened in February 2019. Wiseau reportedly said he intended to film and release Big Shark that year and Bell said he "looked forward to the feature-length project and bringing more work to the Louisiana film community."

It was unclear how serious production was at the time, with reporter Germain Lussier claiming that the trailer was "mostly a joke" and in a 2020 interview, Greg Sestero, who had appeared in the teaser as Georgie, indicated the film was not under development and they had just filmed the trailer for fun.

The project had been revived by late 2021, with Wiseau announcing on Twitter that filming was ongoing in New Orleans on November 16, 2021. In an interview for York Vision later in 2021, Wiseau also indicated his intention to shoot for the film in London. The following year, on July 28, 2022, Wiseau said filming was "in progress and working towards completion".

== Release ==
=== Theatrical ===
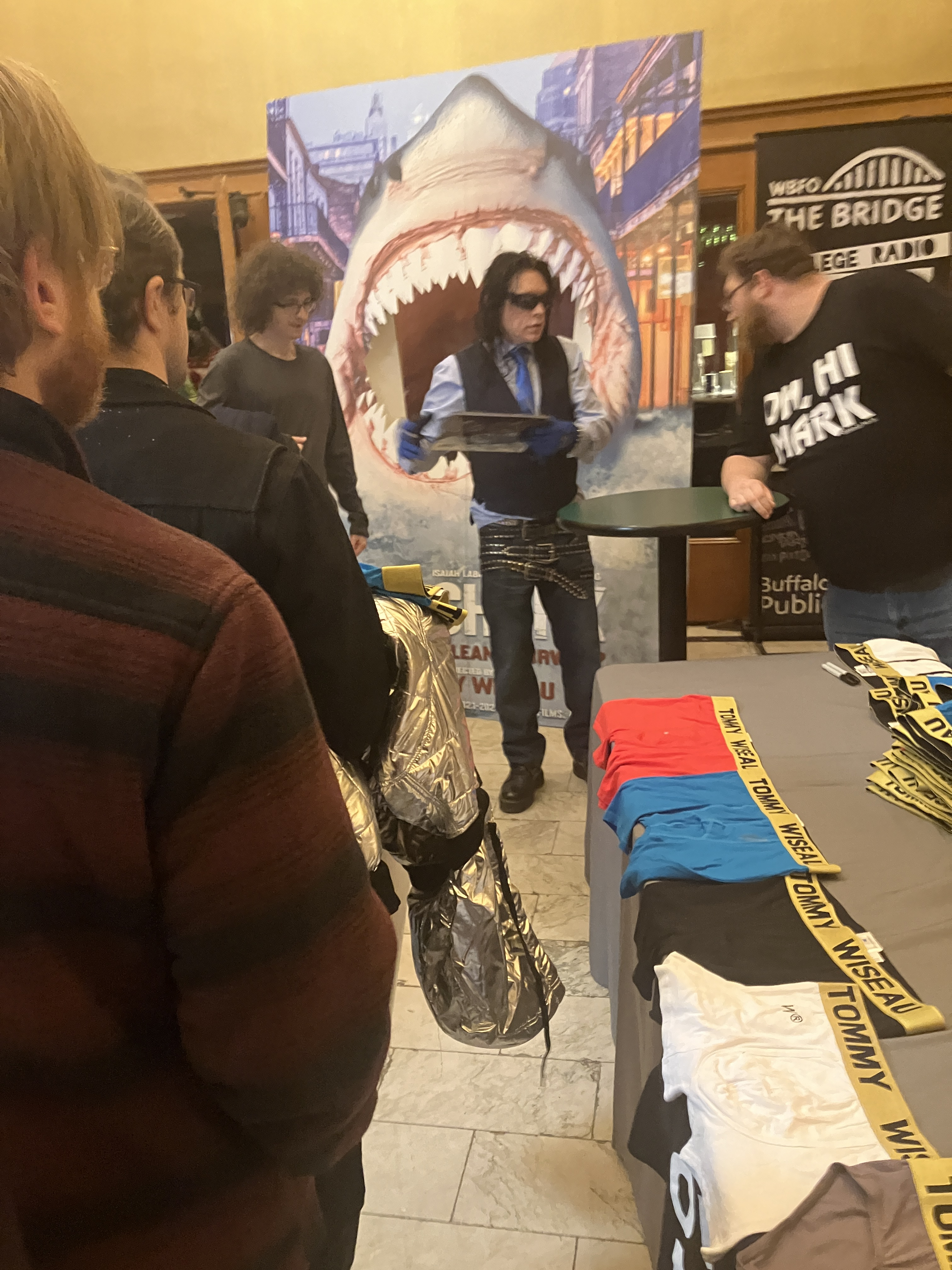
Wiseau at a screening of Big Shark and The Room at the North Park Theatre in Buffalo, New York.

Originally announced and slated to premiere in 2019, the release of Big Shark was subject to a number of delays before it was released in 2023.

The film was originally teased at the Prince Charles Cinema, London during a screening of The Room in 2019, with Wiseau aiming to film it that year and premiere it at the Prince Charles that September.

However, the release was delayed. On July 21, 2020, Wiseau said that the film would be released "soon", before scheduling its release for 2021. By November 8, 2021, the film was set for a theatrical release in 2022, but this too was delayed.

Big Shark had its world pre-premiere on April 2, 2023 at Cinema 21 in Portland, Oregon, before it started a limited roadshow release at Prytania Theatres at Canal Place in New Orleans on April 28 and 29, the Balboa Theatre in San Francisco on May 5 and 6, and August 5, the Landmark Westwood in Los Angeles on June 2 and 3 and July 29, the Reading Cinemas Grossmont in San Diego on July 7 and 8, and the Village East by Angelika in New York City on August 10, 11, 12, and 13.

After three years of delays from its original planned release, Big Shark would finally receive its UK premiere and a limited three day run at the Prince Charles Cinema in September 2023.

While screenings of the film began in April 2023, editing of the film continued. Wiseau announced that the "final cut" would premiere at the Cinema 21 in Portland, Oregon, the same theater that hosted the film's world pre-premiere, on March 16, 2024.

=== Home media ===
The film made its streaming debut on September 4, 2026 on Tubi, alongside The Room.

== Reception ==
=== Box office ===
As of August 24, 2026, Big Shark grossed $30,157 in international territories.

=== Critical response ===
Critical consensus was generally poor, with criticism levied at the acting, editing, and production values, but with recognition that it was a conscious attempt to produce a "so bad it's good" cult movie. There was debate over whether Big Shark managed to recapture the cult success of Wiseau's earlier 2003 movie, The Room.

Casey Epstein-Gross dismissed Big Shark as lacking the authenticity of The Room, writing for The New York Observer, "compared to Big Shark, The Room isn't the Citizen Kane of bad movies. It's straight-up Citizen Kane... despite being even more incoherent and baffling than its predecessor, it seems obvious that Big Shark has no reach beyond Wiseau's already devoted fanbase. It lacks the very thing that made The Room resonate: Wiseau's sincere belief in himself and his intentions."

Jonathan Sim, writing for ComingSoon.net, described Big Shark as "a movie that is just as funny as The Room, if not more so". While he gave the film a 1/10 rating, criticising the editing errors as "too big to be accidental", the acting, and the writing, he characterised it as a self-aware "bad movie" and overall he was positive about the film being entertaining, saying:

You'll break out into applause whenever the heroes vow to save New Orleans. You'll break out into song every time they sing their dumb national anthem. You'll laugh harmoniously with your fellow audience members... You need to watch this movie with as many friends as possible.

Ariana Bindman writing for SFGATE related, "I'd be lying if I said I didn't enjoy the audacity of Big Shark", noting "Big Shark was practically made for live audience interaction, piggybacking off the arthouse longevity of The Room screenings."

Referring to Wiseau's previous cult film characterised as one of the worst films ever made, Sim said, "if The Room was Tommy Wiseau trying to make an Oscar-worthy drama about love, betrayal, and the futility of friendship, Big Shark is Tommy Wiseau trying to make a bad B-movie."

Writing for The Quest, Sabrina Blasik also considered Big Shark as in conversation with The Room, writing:

After the screening Wiseau held a Q&A, and I asked him what his creative vision was with Big Shark. He replied: "To make something different." Indeed, many of Big Shark's creative choices come off as direct reactions to criticism of The Room. The Room was shot on fake-looking sets, so Big Shark was shot on location. "It's not set [sic], ha ha", Wiseau remarked during the Q&A. "I'm laughing on media [sic]. I love media [sic], they're very nice people, but sometimes they're wrong". So in Big Shark, Wiseau sets out to prove the media wrong. The Room is a boring drama with no plot, so Big Shark aims for high-stakes action/horror. The Room has corny music and bad ADR, so Big Shark has no score and uses only live sound. Critics said The Room has a terrible, wooden script? Then most of the dialogue in Big Shark is improvised.
