= Mikaela Loach =

Climate justice activist

- Born: Kingston, Jamaica
- Education: University of Edinburgh
- Website: www.mikaelaloach.com

Mikaela Loach is an acclaimed British author, climate justice organiser, activist, speaker and media personality. She has authored two books: It's Not That Radical: Climate Action to Transform Our World (2023) and Climate Is Just The Start (2025). She was named a top thinker of 2024 by Prospect.

With Jo Becker, Loach co-hosts the Yikes podcast, which explores climate change, human rights and social justice. Loach co-founded AWETHU School of Organising alongside anti-racism educator, Jess Mally, with AWETHU's first cohort taking place in September 2024.

== Early life and education ==
Loach was born in Kingston, Jamaica, to a British father and Jamaican mother and moved to Surrey at age 3. She studied Medicine at the University of Edinburgh. Mikaela Loach also holds a degree in Global Health Policy.

== Career ==
=== Campaigns ===
Loach advocates for environmental justice, racial justice, sustainable fashion, as well as speaking out on issues such as white supremacy and maltreatment of migrants. She also seeks to make the climate movement more inclusive and promoting 'active hope' and collective action, which extends to all "emitting" industries and areas of cultural institutions and of event sponsorship.

During part of 2019 Extinction Rebellion climate crisis protests in London, Loach locked-on for eight hours in an attempt to prevent police clearing a site. She also campaigns with Climate Camp Scotland. She was a speaker at Zurich Insurance Group's Youth Against Carbon Conference.

In December 2021, Loach took part in a judicial review alongside other activists, to challenge the UK Government's oil and gas strategy. In January 2022, the High Court found against the activists, stating the case had "no basis in the statute". Her "Stop Oil" campaigning continues and has an impact on young activists. A related campaign Loach engages in is against fast fashion and supply chains bringing the physical, environmental damage and human rights issues together, and attempts to improve advice and practices in the market, and has concerns about the hidden emissions from buildings.

In 2022, Loach became the first climate activist to feature on the cover of music and culture magazine, KERRANG!.

She was one of the authors who disrupted the Edinburgh International Book Festival in 2024, in relation to sponsorship concerns. Loach sees the various campaigns as integrated, comparing her "networks of resistance" to a network of fungi, linking trees in a forest.

=== Podcast and writing ===
In 2020, Loach created the Yikes podcast with Jo Becker.

Via a five-way auction in 2022, DK Life acquired the rights to publish Loach's debut book It's Not That Radical: Climate Action to Transform Our World in 2023.

Loach's second book Climate Is Just The Start was published via Random House Children's in 2025. That same year, Loach was appointed a Launchpad Fellow of The Safina Center.

=== AWETHU School of Organising ===
In 2024, Mikaela Loach co-founded AWETHU alongside anti-racism educator, Jess Mally. The name AWETHU is derived from the anti-apartheid chant "Amandla Awethu," meaning "the power is ours."

"AWETHU was established to address the lack of political education in movement spaces and the prevalent culture of merely "reading the right books" without translating that knowledge into action. Inspired by the educational models of the Black Panthers, Ella Baker in SNCC and The Ella Baker School of Organising in the UK, AWETHU aims to provide a robust framework for political education and organising. Together, Mikaela and Jess have over a decade of experience in organising for climate justice, Black liberation and social change."

AWETHU School of Organising runs yearly cohorts (a curriculum covering the basics of climate justice, colonial history, anti-racism and anti-capitalism, as well as organising principles to build successful campaigns and wellbeing in activism to ensure this work is truly sustainable), with the next eight-week cohort scheduled for September-October 2026 in Brighton.

== Publications ==
- It's Not That Radical: Climate Action to Transform Our World. London: DK, 2023. ISBN 978-0241597538.
- Climate Is Just The Start. Bright Matters (Random House), 2025. ISBN 978-0-593-89732-4.

== Accolades ==
In 2020, Loach was nominated for a Global Citizen Award in the UK Hero category. She featured on the BBC Woman's Hour Power List of "women protecting our planet" and the Forbes list of UK Leading Environmentalists.

Loach's debut book It's Not That Radical won the Non-fiction prize at the 2023 Indie Champion Book Awards. Loach was named a top thinker of 2024 by Prospect. Loach's second book Climate Is Just The Start has been awarded Junior Library Guild Gold Standard, a starred review from Booklist and the 2025 Blueberry Changemaker Award.
