= Cinema 21 =

Movie theater in Portland, Oregon, U.S.

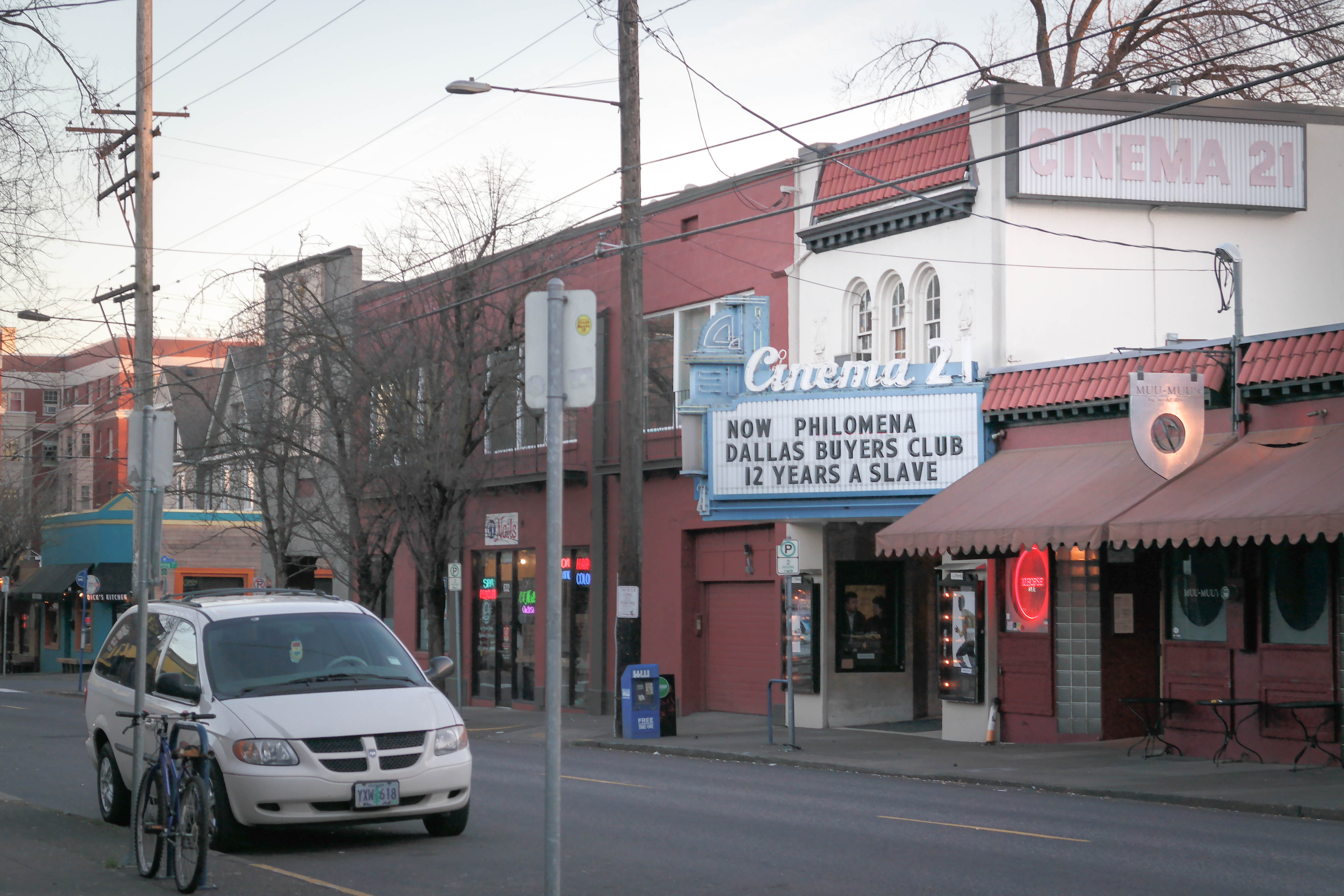
- The theater's exterior in January 2014

- Location in Portland, Oregon
- Former names: State Theatre (1925–1941); Vista (1941–1942); 21st Avenue Theatre (1942–1965)
- Address: 616 Northwest 21st Avenue
- Location: Portland, Oregon
- Coordinates: 45.52735°N 122.69428°W
- Owner: Tom Ranieri

Website
- www.cinema21.com

Cinema 21 is a movie theater in the Northwest District of Portland, Oregon, United States. The venue opened as State Theatre in 1925, and was known as Vista during 1941–1942 and 21st Avenue Theatre from 1942 to 1965.

== History ==
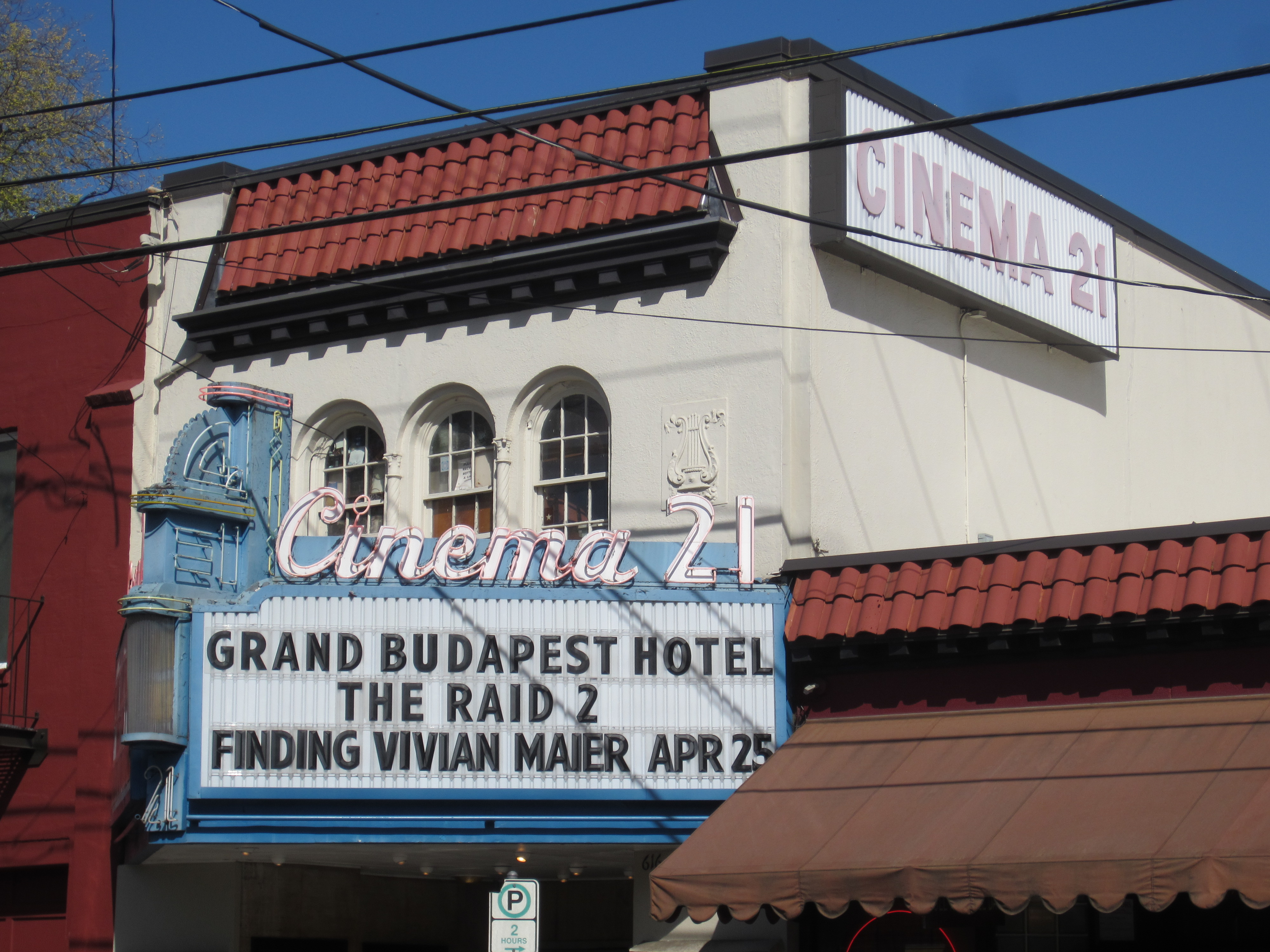
The theater's marquee in 2014

The venue opened as State Theatre in 1925, and was known as Vista during 1941–1942 and 21st Avenue Theatre from 1942 to 1965.

Cinema 21 is known for supporting independent and local filmmakers and has hosted many events and festivals during its long history. Mike Birbiglia, Mark Duplass, Todd Haynes, Miranda July, Richard Linklater, Russ Meyer, Steven Soderbergh, Gus Van Sant, and Wim Wenders have all discussed their projects at the theater.

In August 2014, the theater launched a $70,000 Kickstarter campaign for new seats in its main auditorium as part of a larger renovation project which included the installation of two additional screens. According to owner Tom Ranieri, the seats were more than fifty years old. Incentives for campaign contributions included film admission passes, dinners at local restaurants, name appearances on the marquee, dinners with Van Sant and Dan Savage, and naming rights to the auditorium. In December 2014, the theater hosted the premiere and an after party for Wild; the film's stars Reese Witherspoon and Laura Dern attended. In April 2023, the theater also hosted the premiere of Tommy Wiseau's second film Big Shark.
