= USS Bergall (SSN-667) =

Submarine of the United States

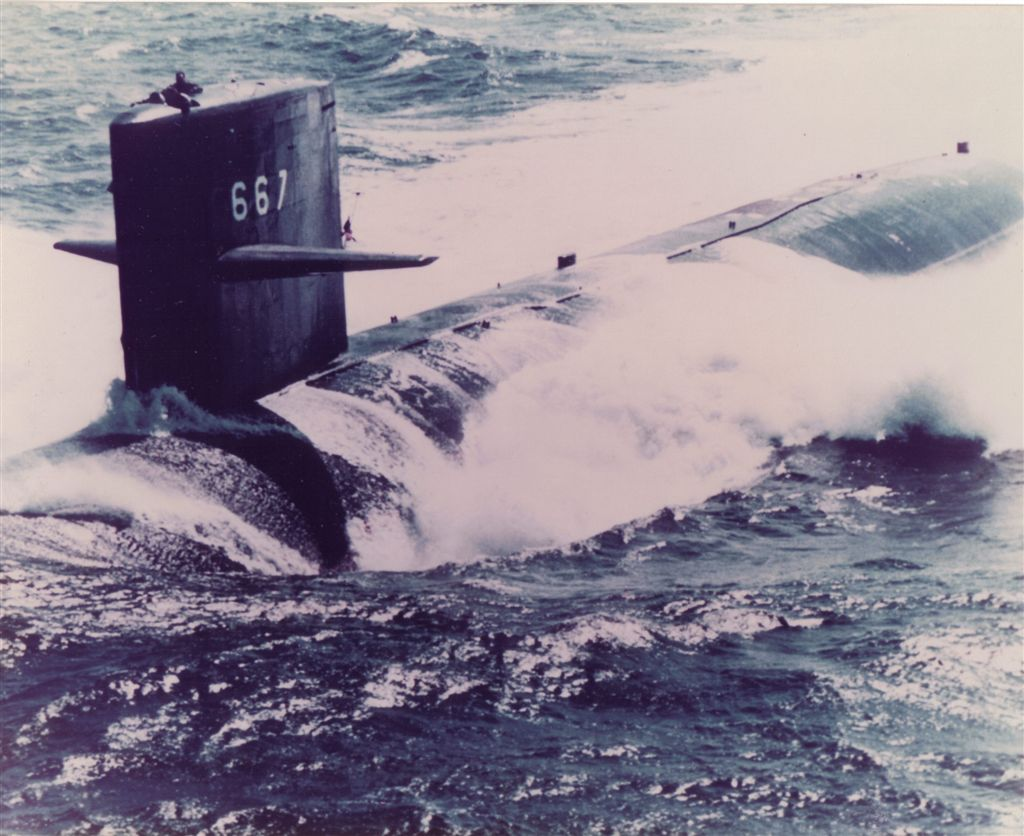
- USS Bergall (SSN-667), possibly while on sea trials off New England in 1968-1969.

History

United States
- Name: USS Bergall (SSN-667)
- Namesake: The bergall, a small fish found along the Atlantic coast of North America
- Ordered: 9 March 1965
- Builder: General Dynamics Electric Boat
- Laid down: 16 April 1966
- Launched: 17 February 1968
- Sponsored by: Mrs. Ray C. Needham
- Commissioned: 13 June 1969
- Decommissioned: 6 June 1996
- Stricken: 6 June 1997
- Motto: Invisible, Invulnerable, Invincible
- Fate: Scrapping via Ship and Submarine Recycling Program completed 29 September 1997

General characteristics
- Class & type: Sturgeon-class attack submarine
- Displacement: 4,007 long tons (4,071 t) light; 4,301 long tons (4,370 t) full; 294 long tons (299 t) dead
- Length: 292 ft 3 in (89.08 m)
- Beam: 31 ft 8 in (9.65 m)
- Draft: 28 ft 8 in (8.74 m)
- Installed power: 15,000 shaft horsepower (11.2 megawatts)
- Propulsion: One S5W nuclear reactor, two steam turbines, one screw
- Speed: 15 knots (28 km/h; 17 mph) surfaced; 25 knots (46 km/h; 29 mph) submerged
- Test depth: 1,300 feet (400 meters)
- Complement: 109 (14 officers, 95 enlisted men)
- Armament: 4 × 21-inch (533 mm) torpedo tubes

USS Bergall (SSN-667), a Sturgeon-class attack submarine, was the second ship of the United States Navy to be named for the bergall, a small fish found along the Atlantic coast of North America from the Chesapeake Bay to Labrador.

== Construction and commissioning ==
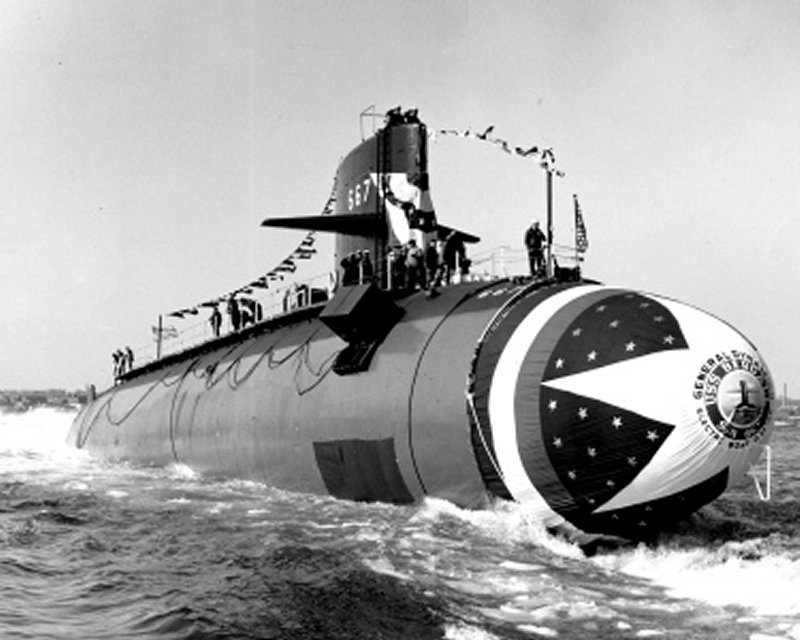
Bergall is launched at the Electric Boat Division of General Dynamics Corporation at Groton, Connecticut, on 17 February 1968.

The contract to build Bergall was awarded to General Dynamics Electric Boat on 9 March 1965 and her keel was laid down on 16 April 1966. She was launched on 17 February 1968, sponsored by Mrs. Ray C. Needham, and commissioned on 13 June 1969.

== Service history ==
=== 1969-1984 ===
Ship's Motto: "Invisible, Invulnerable, Invincible"

BERGALL is the second submarine to bear the name. The first was built by Electric Boat in 1944. During World War II, SS 320 made five war patrols and sank or damaged over 100,000 tons of enemy shipping. This is the reason for there being five stars on the SSN 667 Ship's Crest.

The USS Bergall (SSN 667) was a STURGEON Class, especially designed as an anti-submarine weapon. Her keel was laid on 4 April 1966 and she was launched 17 February 1968. After completion of her sea trials she was commissioned on 13 June 1969. She became the 84th nuclear submarine to enter the Fleet and the 43rd attack type. Her assignment upon commissioning was to Submarine Development Group Two in Groton, Connecticut. This assignment was to fully test the Navy's newest all-purpose sonar, the AN/BQS-13.

In 1970 Bergall became the first submarine to undergo the MK-48 torpedo conversion and in 1971 she was the first ship to carry the MK-48 torpedo in its operational warshot configuration. The AN/BQQ-5 digital sonar system was temporarily installed for test and evaluation in 1972. Bergall was awarded her first Navy Unit Commendation that year for her performance in the testing of the sonar systems and outstanding MK-48 torpedo proficiency. BERGALL has earned the Navy Unit Commendation (twice), Meritorious Unit Commendation (Four times), and numerous Battle Efficiency ("E"), Anti-submarine Warfare ("A"), Weapons Proficiency ("E"), Damage Control ("DC") and Communications ("C").

Bergall was twice awarded the Commander, Sixth Fleet "Hook 'Em" award during deployment to the Mediterranean in 1977 and 1982.

Bergall appeared in three movies – "The Submarine", "Topside Safety" and episode 3 of the British TV series Sailor . In Sailor a medical evacuation from BERGALL was undertaken by a helicopter from the British Aircraft Carrier HMS Ark Royal

Bergall was the first east -coast submarine to carry a Deep Submergence Rescue Vehicle (DSRV).

Bergall completed 14 deployments and various exercises and operations vital to the national security of the United States.

1983 Deployed on North Atlantic Patrol for 3 months.

1983 Upon return to Norfolk, VA, SUBRON 6, she immediately resupplied then got underway for a second North Atlantic Patrol taking the billet left vacant by another sub, unable to leave the pier due to engineering difficulties.

Summer 1984 Complement of ships divers is made ready with qualification of crew members Matthew Cronley MM1SSDV, Curt Escher RM2SSDV and David Finch ET2SSDV.

October 1984 CDR Steven V. Mladineo turns over command to CDR Stephen Gibbs.

January 1985 Deployed for the North Atlantic then after refit at Holy Loch, Scotland sailed for the Mediterranean where she performed several patrols in support of 6th fleet operations.

April 1985 Refit Sardinia, Italy then returned to operations in support of the 6th fleet.

June 1985 Bergall returned home to SUBRON 6 Norfolk, VA after 6 months away.

She was inactivated on 4 August 1995 and decommissioned 6 June 1996.

=== Collision with USS Kittiwake (ASR-13), 1984 ===
On 23 April 1984, the submarine rescue vessel USS Kittiwake (ASR-13) collided with Bergall at Norfolk, Virginia, while Bergall was moored to the pier aft of Kittiwake. Kittiwake was getting underway for the first time since she had undergone maintenance, during which her main drive motor was re-wired improperly, causing it and the screw it drove to rotate in the opposite direction from that ordered by personnel on Kittiwake's bridge. This was unknown to Kittiwake's bridge personnel, who found that Kittiwake started to drift aft when they were expecting her to move forward. Noting the backward motion, they ordered an increase in the motor drive speed in order to correct it and get Kittiwake moving forward, but unwittingly caused Kittiwake to move further aft and at a higher speed. Still not realizing that Kittiwake's main drive motor operating in reverse of what they expected, Kittiwake's bridge personnel then ordered another increase in Kittiwake's forward speed, which only served to increase her speed astern. This continued until Kittiwake's stern backed into Bergall's sonar dome.

== Decommissioning and disposal ==
Bergall was decommissioned on 6 June 1996 and stricken from the Naval Vessel Register on 6 June 1997. Her scrapping via the Nuclear-Powered Ship and Submarine Recycling Program at Puget Sound Naval Shipyard in Bremerton, Washington, was completed on 29 September 1997.
