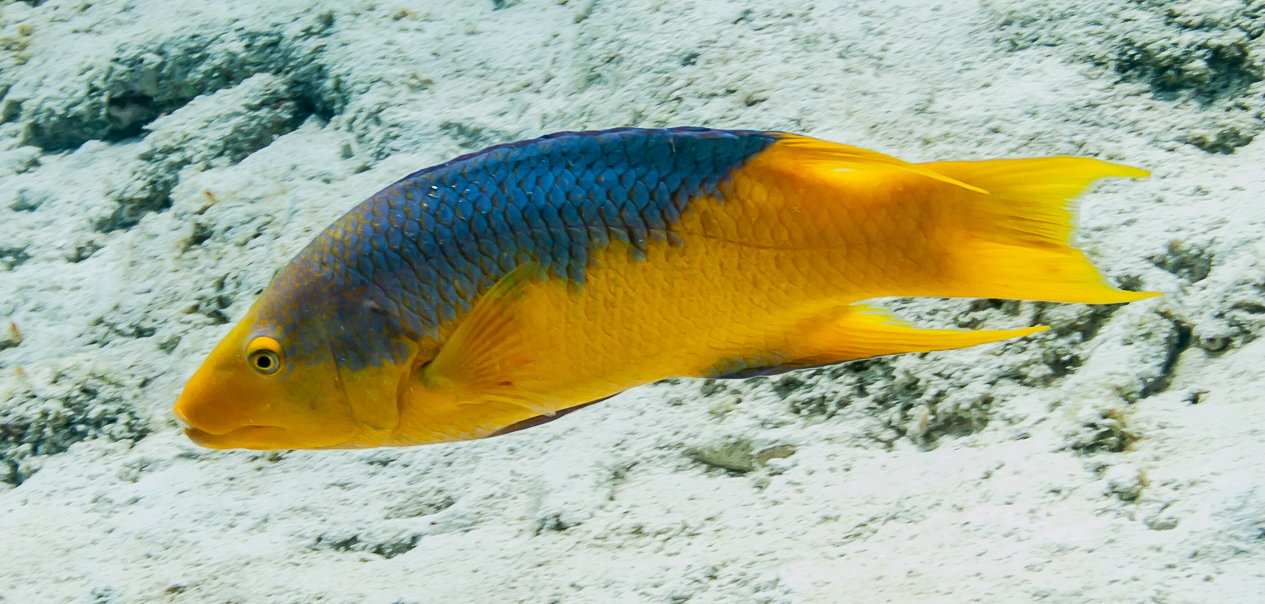
- Adult
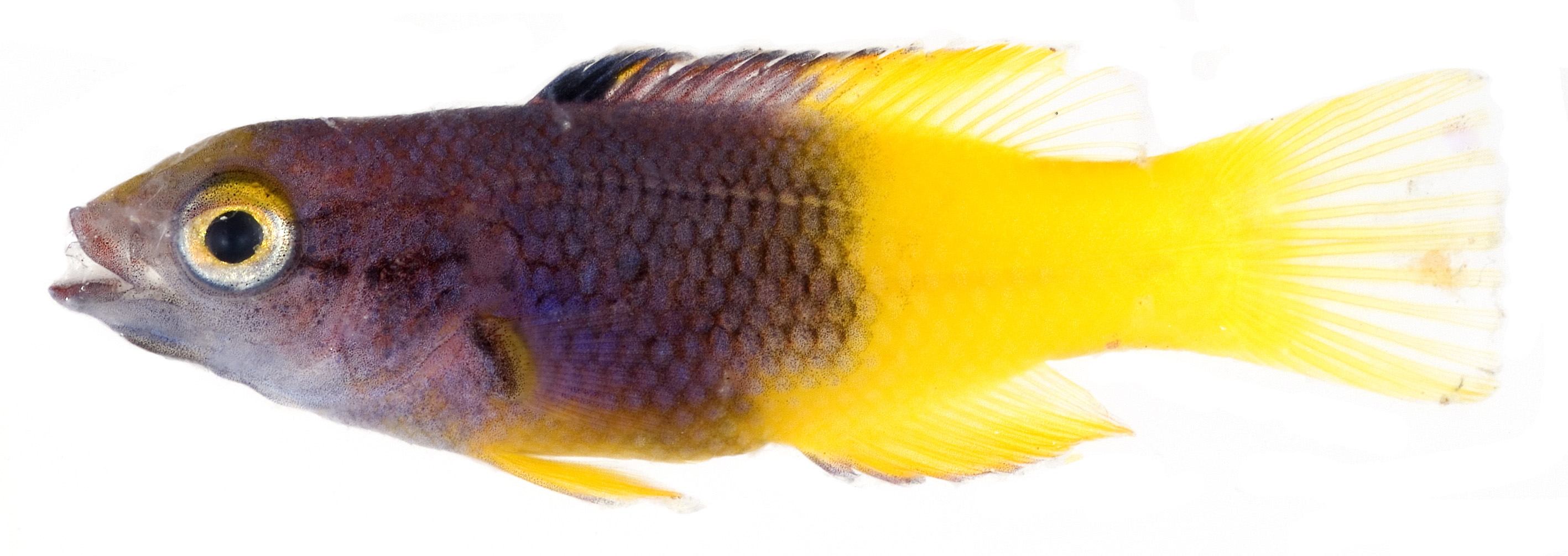
- Juvenile

Conservation status
- Least Concern (IUCN 3.1)

Scientific classification
- Kingdom: Animalia
- Phylum: Chordata
- Class: Actinopterygii
- Order: Labriformes
- Family: Labridae
- Genus: Bodianus
- Species: B. rufus

Binomial name
- Bodianus rufus (Linnaeus, 1758)

Synonyms
- Labrus rufus Linnaeus, 1758; Bodianus bodianus Bloch, 1790; Lutjanus verres Bloch, 1791; Sparus falcatus Bloch, 1791; Labrus semiruber Lacépède, 1801; Harpe caeruleoaureus Lacépède, 1802; Bodianus blochii Lacépède, 1802; Bodianus brachyrhynus Miranda-Ribeiro, 1918

= Spanish hogfish =

Species of fish

The Spanish hogfish (Bodianus rufus) is a species of wrasse native to the western Atlantic Ocean, where it can be found from North Carolina and Bermuda through the Caribbean and the Gulf of Mexico to southern Brazil. It inhabits coral or rock reefs at depths of 1 to 70 m (3.3 to 229.7 ft). While the adults feed on such prey as molluscs (snails, mussels, and squid), crustaceans (Mysis and brine shrimp), echinoderms (brittle stars and sea urchins), worms, and small fish, the juveniles act as cleaner fishes. This species can reach a length of 40 cm (16 in), though most do not exceed 28 cm (11 in). This species is of minor importance to local commercial fisheries and can be found in the aquarium trade. When Marcus Elieser Bloch named the genus Bodianus, he used B. bodianus as the type species of the genus, which is a junior synonym of B. rufus.
