= The Safina Center =

Nonprofit organization in the USA

Safina Center
- Type: Nonprofit
- Tax ID no.: 61-1406022
- Legal status: 501(c)(3)
- Headquarters: Setauket, New York
- President: Carl Safina
- Website: https://www.safinacenter.org/
- Formerly called: Blue Ocean Institute

The Safina Center is a 501(c)3 nonprofit nature conservation and environmental organization headquartered in Setauket, New York as part of Stony Brook University. It was founded in 2003 as the Blue Ocean Institute and later renamed in honor of the founder, Carl Safina.

== History ==
The Safina Center was founded in 2003 by Dr. Carl Safina, (PhD in Ecology from Rutgers University), a MacArthur fellow and inaugural holder of the Endowed Chair for Nature and Humanity at Stony Brook University.

Its original focus was ocean science and policy, primarily fish and fisheries. Subsequently, their focus widened as climate-related issues such as global warming and ocean acidification made it necessary to address the global influence of energy, food production, material culture and the expanding human footprint on not just the ocean but on the living world generally. The Safina Center began wide exploration and interpretation of how humans are changing the living world, and what those changes mean for life-supporting systems, living nature, and people.
