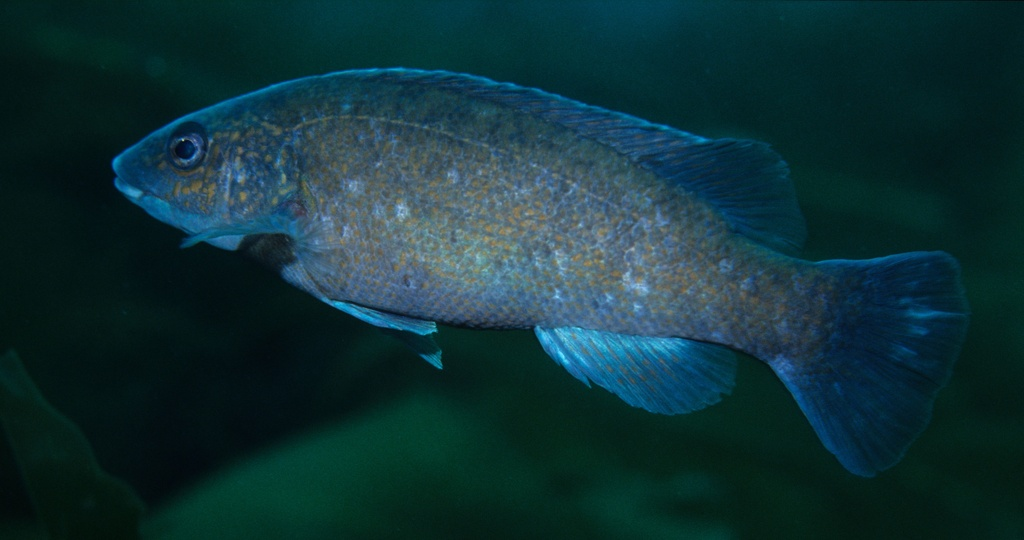

Conservation status
- Least Concern (IUCN 3.1)

Scientific classification
- Kingdom: Animalia
- Phylum: Chordata
- Class: Actinopterygii
- Division: Teleostei
- Order: Labriformes
- Family: Labridae
- Subfamily: Labrinae
- Genus: Tautogolabrus; Günther, 1862
- Species: T. adspersus

Binomial name
- Tautogolabrus adspersus (Walbaum, 1792)

Synonyms
- Labrus adspersus Walbaum, 1792; Ctenolabrus brandaonis Steindachner, 1867; Tautogolabrus brandaonis (Steindachner, 1867)

= Cunner =

Species of fish

The cunner (Tautogolabrus adspersus), also known as the blue perch, bergall, chogset, choggie, conner or sea perch, is a species of wrasse native to the northwestern Atlantic, where it is found from the Gulf of St. Lawrence and Newfoundland to the Chesapeake Bay. They inhabit inshore waters living near the sea floor at depths from 10 to 128 m (33 to 420 ft), preferring areas with beds of seaweed, shipwrecks, or wharf pilings. They spend the winter months in a state of torpor underneath rocks. They can also be found in the aquarium trade.

Often, cunner is found mixed in with tautogs, living on or near the same structures. Much of the food eaten by those bergall living among blackfish are the leftovers from the blackfishes prey. They can be distinguished from the tautog by their pointed snouts. Cunners are generally smaller, so are usually thrown back by anglers who think they caught a "short" tautog. In past years, they have been important commercial fish, but now are considered pests. They can be confused with black sea bass, rockfish and other grouper, as well as tautog, for their ability to change color.

Cunner can enter a hypometabolic state in response to cold temperatures and hypoxic conditions. In Newfoundland, Canada, cunner have been recorded entering a dormant state in Autumn, when temperatures fall below 5°C, and remaining dormant until May/June.

Tautogolabrus adspersus is currently the only known member of its genus.

On May 26, 2019, the NJDEP Division of Fish and Wildlife officially certified the catch of a new state record saltwater fish, weighing 3 pounds, 8.8 ounces, eclipsing the previous state record by 6.4 ounces. The fish measured 18.5″ in length and had a girth of 13″.

== Gallery ==
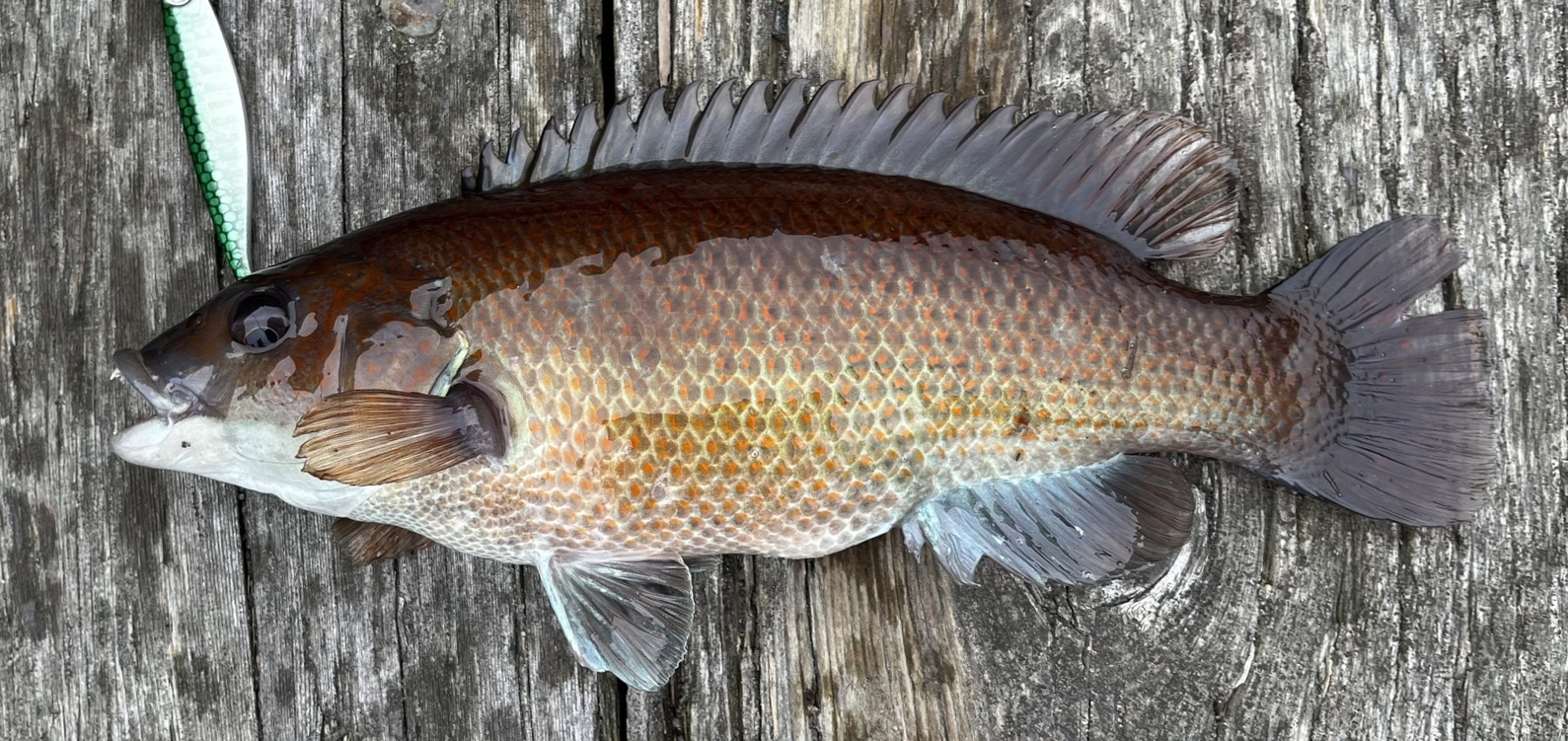
Nova Scotia, Canada

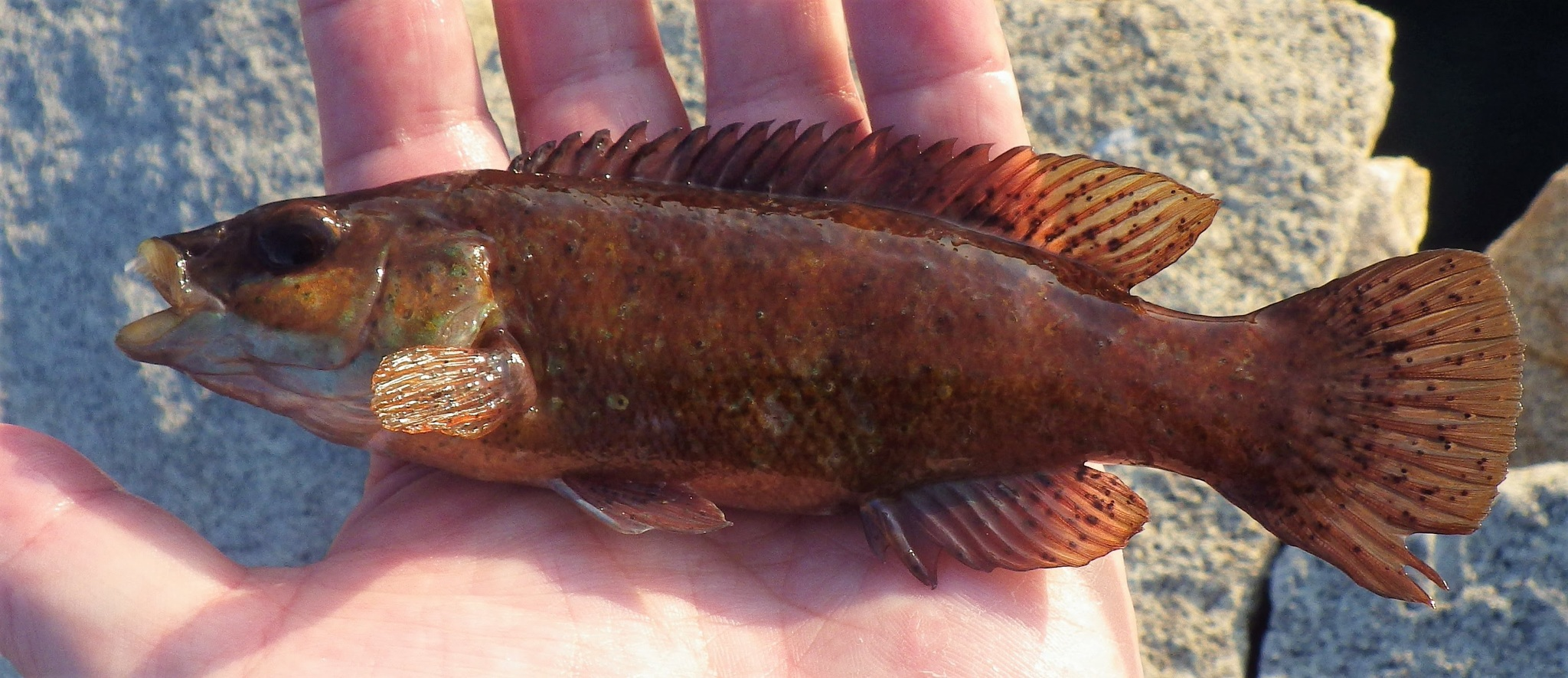
Massachusetts, USA

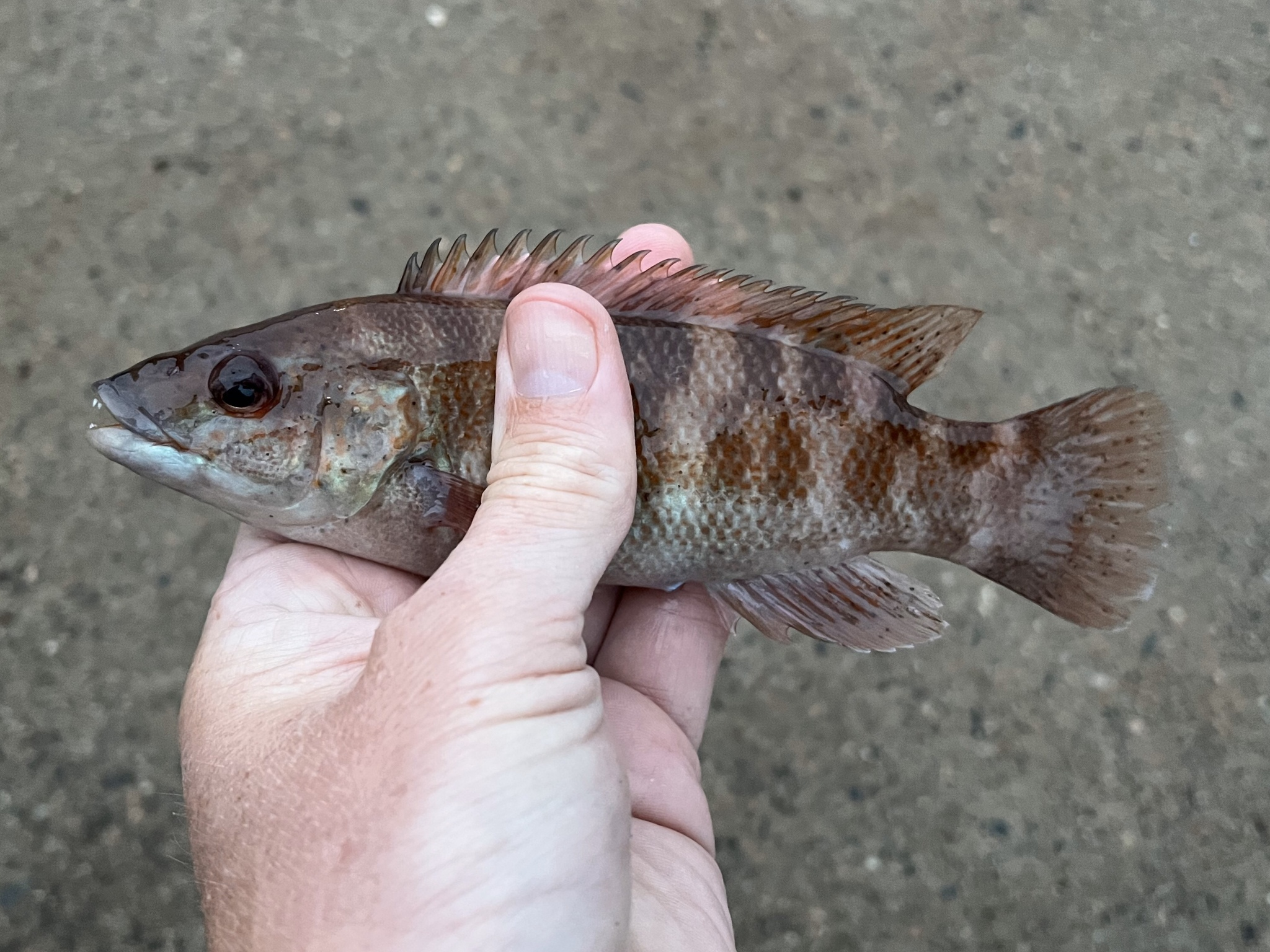
New Brunswick, Canada

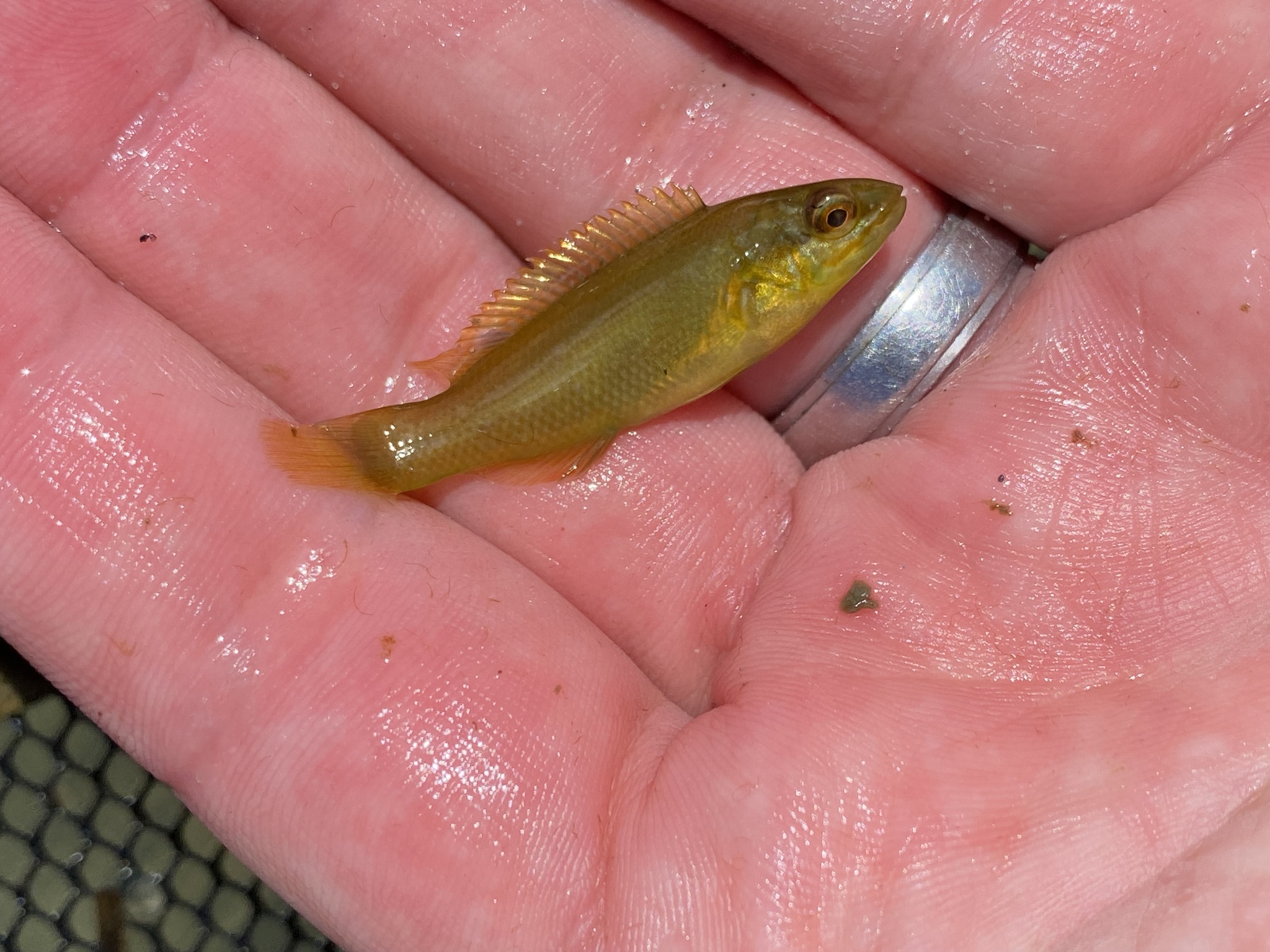
Juvenile, New York, USA

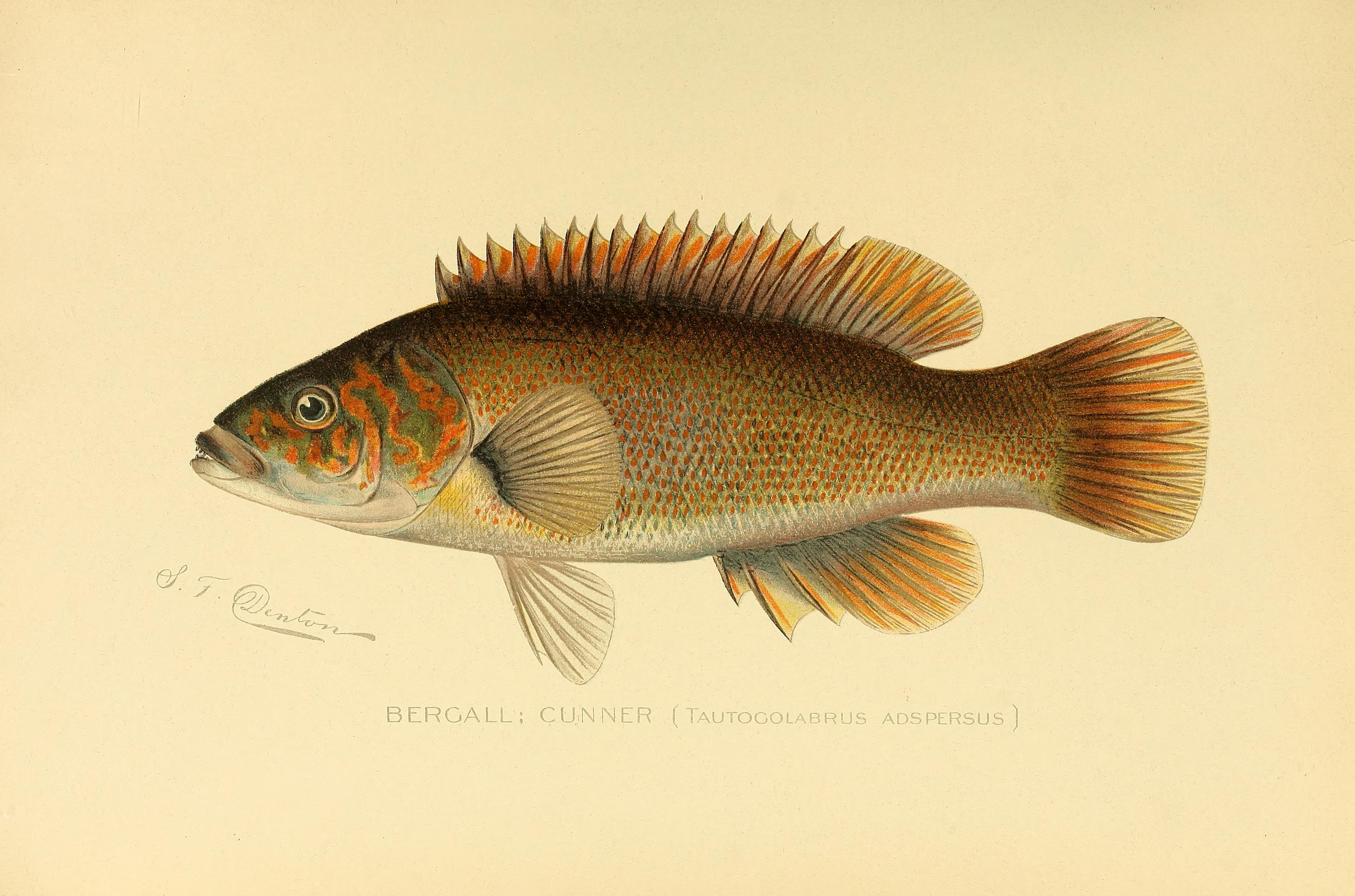
1899 illustration
