= Best F(r)iends =

2017 American comedy film by Justin MacGregor

- Theatrical release poster
- Directed by: Justin MacGregor
- Written by: Greg Sestero
- Produced by: Greg Sestero; Justin MacGregor; Kristopher MacGregor
- Starring: Greg Sestero; Tommy Wiseau; Kristen StephensonPino; Vince Jolivette; Paul Scheer; Rick Edwards
- Cinematography: Justin MacGregor; Farhan Umedaly
- Edited by: Justin MacGregor
- Music by: Daniel Platzman
- Production companies: Sestero Pictures; Roguescots; VoVo Productions
- Distributed by: Grindstone Entertainment Group; Lionsgate
- Release dates: September 4, 2017 (Prince Charles Cinema); March 30, 2018 (Volume One); June 1, 2018 (Volume Two)
- Running time: Volume One: 108 minutes; Volume Two: 95 minutes; Both volumes: 203 minutes
- Country: United States
- Language: English
- Box office: Volume One: $290,064; Volume Two: $141,524

Best F(r)iends is a 2017 American dark comedy thriller film starring Tommy Wiseau and Greg Sestero. Written and produced by Sestero in two parts (Volume One and Volume Two), it marks the reunion of Wiseau and Sestero 15 years after making the cult classic film The Room. The plot follows a homeless drifter in Los Angeles who begins working at a morgue, only to realize his boss is hiding a mysterious past.

The film played at various festivals starting in September 2017, and in 2018 it was distributed theatrically in two volumes through Fathom Events. Best F(r)iends: Volume One received one screening each day on March 30 and April 2, 2018, and Volume Two received the same treatment on June 1 and 4.

The film received generally mixed reviews, though some critics praised its use of Wiseau and believed it could appeal to fans of The Room.

== Plot ==
=== Volume One ===
In Los Angeles, a young and lonesome drifter, Jon Kortina, encounters an eccentric mortician named Harvey Lewis. Harvey takes in the homeless Jon, who is wearing a bloody T-shirt, and agrees to hire him as an assistant in his mortuary. The two become friends and hatch an underground enterprise selling the gold fillings which Harvey has collected from the teeth of corpses over the years.

Jon meets bartender Traci Walton; they begin dating and Jon eventually moves in with her. Jon learns some mysterious details of Harvey's past (some involving "the Black Dahlia"). Upset that Harvey is withholding his share from the dental scrap sales, Jon suspects he is being cheated—suspicions fueled by an overheard conversation of Harvey's with a man named Malmo.

Assisted by Traci, Jon plots to trick Harvey into attending a non-existent Rolling Stones concert, planning to leave him on the side of the road and drive away with both their shares of their profits. Harvey spots a hole in the stratagem and confronts Jon; in an ensuing struggle Harvey falls from a cliff into the ocean.

=== Volume Two ===
Volume Two is framed by numerous cuts throughout two scenes of Jon in Harvey's captivity. These scenes reveal more about their backstories: that Harvey's lover was murdered, becoming the Black Dahlia, and that Jon's bloody shirt in the opening of Volume One was the result of an attempt at suicide by jumping. The two bicker and eventually come to terms with their perceived betrayals of each other.

In the "present" scenes, Jon and Traci attempt to open Harvey's safe (which has the outward appearance of an ATM); without the correct key, they take the entire safe with them and begin driving toward Colorado. After a close call with a police officer in Arizona over expired tags, Jon and Traci ditch their vehicle and call Traci's Uncle Rick for help.

They travel to Rick's ranch house with the safe, which Jon claims contains his college transfer papers for Colorado State University. Rick displays odd and intimidating behavior, such as exercising in front of them and forcing Jon to drink a nightcap, and Jon has a nightmare about Rick and Harvey.

In the morning, Rick reveals that he's unable to get around the safe's extra security mechanisms, and recommends hiring local locksmith Doc Seagar. Doc walks out to the ranch, but when he surmises that there's something potentially illegal going on he demands $25,000, which Rick refuses to provide. Doc calls his employee Vicente to bring nitric acid to open the safe and holds Jon, Traci, and Rick at gunpoint while they wait. Vicente recognizes Traci as a figure from his past and becomes enraged, taking her inside to kill her with a knife. Before he can kill her, he and Doc are both shot and seemingly killed by an unseen figure.

As Jon and Rick plot to dispose of Vicente and Doc's bodies and open the safe themselves, Jon discovers Harvey's car in Rick's garage. He confronts Rick and it is revealed that Rick and Traci are actually a romantic couple who have been scamming Jon; Rick had tailed Harvey and Jon the night Harvey fell from the cliff and stole Harvey's car after Jon fled. Rick leads Jon on a trail to murder him, but Harvey kills Rick and saves Jon, revealing that Harvey survived the fall in Volume One. Jon and Harvey make up and return to Rick's house to confront Traci, with whom Jon breaks up, despite her pleas, and leaves alone.

Harvey drives Jon back to Los Angeles to a home he has purchased for Jon, revealing his secrecy in Volume One to be part of a surprise gift; Malmo was a real estate agent who sold him the house. He also informs Jon that he has enrolled him at a nearby college, and they happily enter the house.

The film ends as a still-alive Vicente arrives outside Jon's new home with a thirst for vengeance.

== Cast ==
- Tommy Wiseau as Harvey Lewis, a lonely mortician who meets Jon and takes him on a wild journey.
- Greg Sestero as Jon Kortina, a young drifter who lost his family to a tragedy as a child.
- Paul Scheer as Malmo, a mysterious figure who is working with Harvey.
- Kristen StephensonPino as Traci Walton, a young career woman who Jon meets and falls in love with.
- Vince Jolivette as Andrei
- R.J. Cantu as Vicente
- Rick Edwards as Rick Stanton
- Alistair A. Duff as Gil "Doc" Seagar

== Background ==
Best F(r)iends is Greg Sestero and Tommy Wiseau's first project together since 2003's The Room.

After watching an early cut of The Disaster Artist (the film based on The Disaster Artist, a book about the making of The Room) Greg Sestero felt sympathy for Tommy Wiseau, leading him to create a film for the two of them in order to make Wiseau happy. Over the course of a few weeks, Sestero wrote the script for Best F(r)iends.

== Production ==
The film was inspired by a road trip made by Sestero and Wiseau in April 2003, after the production of Wiseau's cult classic film The Room, which is widely considered to be the "best" worst film ever made. Principal production began in 2016 in Los Angeles, California.

The musical score was created by Daniel Platzman of Imagine Dragons. The film was written and produced by Sestero. According to star Paul Scheer, the script was only 100 pages long and it was originally filmed as a single movie, with the decision to split it into two movies only coming after filming was complete.

== Release ==
In the trailer for Best F(r)iends shown after the January 10, 2018 The Room Fathom event, it was announced that the film will be released in two volumes, on March 30, 2018 and on June 1, 2018. The film premiered at Prince Charles Cinema on September 4, 2017 and screened at the Egyptian Theatre on September 30, 2017 during BeyondFest in Los Angeles.

== Reception ==
=== Critical response ===
Drew Fortune of Vanity Fair said it "could be the film you never knew you needed". Ben Pearson of /Film gave the film 3.5/10, writing, "The rating is almost totally meaningless: those who are curious about this aren't going to let any rating stop them from seeking it out, and frankly, that's the way it should be. Though I personally didn't care much for it, I can easily imagine some of you going wild for this unusual reunion. For comparison's sake, I'd give The Room a 1 out of 10, so make of that what you will." Writing for Film Threat, Matthew Passantino gave the film a grade of "D" and said, "Tone deaf at almost every turn... Best F(r)iends won't have the same legs as The Room but could offer a night of fun with some of your closest f(r)iends. It's terrible. Try and see it." Jake Pesaruk of Vue Weekly gave it 3/5 stars, writing that it is difficult to critique Tommy Wiseau films because of his paradoxical appeal, but the film allows Wiseau to "flex his acting prowess". The A.V. Club's Nathan Rabin praised Best F(r)iends' making "smart use of its stars' idiosyncratic talents", saying it "suggests there's no such thing as a bad actor... only actors badly used. Best F(r)iends makes inspired use of Wiseau by drawing extensively on both his onscreen history with Sestero and their offscreen friendship, a curious bond documented for posterity."

Volume One has a Rotten Tomatoes score of 42%, based on reviews from 12 critics, and an average rating 4/10.

=== Accolades ===
Best F(r)iends: Volume One was awarded the Executive Director Award for Most Buzzworthy Film at the 2018 Gasparilla International Film Festival in Tampa, Florida. Volume One also won Best Cinematography at the 2018 MayDay Film Festival in Evansville, Indiana.
