= Janjigian =

Janjigian (Armenian: Ջանջիգյան) is an Armenian surname. Notable people with the surname include:

- Dan Janjigian (born 1972), Armenian-American actor, bobsledder, and political candidate
- Thomas Janjigian (born 1994), American soccer player
- Yelena Janjigian, Medical Oncologist, Memorial Sloan Kettering
- Michael Janjigian, NYU Grossman School of Medicine
