= Ghost Shark 2: Urban Jaws =

2015 New Zealand supernatural horror film

- Release date: 27 June 2015
- Running time: 70 minutes
- Country: New Zealand
- Language: English

Ghost Shark 2: Urban Jaws is a 2015 New Zealand supernatural horror film directed by Andrew Todd and Johnny Hall. It was shot in Auckland, New Zealand, with additional shooting taking place in Christchurch and Los Angeles.

== Plot ==
The plot concerns the mayor of Auckland and an "expert ghost shark hunter" as they fight to save the city from a supernatural beast known as Ghost Shark. Despite being labelled "Ghost Shark 2", it is not related to SyFy's Ghost Shark, and the decision to make it a sequel was made for narrative reasons. The tone of the film is that of a serious drama, despite the seemingly parodic subject material.

== Cast ==
- Campbell Cooley as Mayor Jack Broody
- Johnny Hall as Tom Logan
- Steve Austin as Tony Palantine
- Kathleen Burns as Emily Morgan
- Roberto Nascimento as Marco Guerra
- Isabella Burt as Martina Guerra
- Stig Eldred as Sean Logan
- Juliette Danielle as Elsie Grey
- David Farrier as himself

== Production ==
Ghost Shark 2 originated as a faux trailer in the vein of Hobo with a Shotgun, released on YouTube on 14 August 2010. Several websites and blogs took notice, and the trailer got posted on many websites like Cinefantastique, SlashFilm, Premiere.fr., and CBSSports.com.The online attention prompted the directors to turn the faux trailer into a feature film, and production on this feature version began in Auckland in October 2010, with further shooting taking place in Christchurch. A second teaser was released on Christmas Day 2010 along with behind-the-scenes photos and information on the official website. A third trailer was released on 14 August 2013. One scene in the film features actors George Hardy (Troll 2), Juliette Danielle (The Room), and Alan Bagh (Birdemic: Shock and Terror) in small roles. It represents the first time actors from these three so-called "Best Worst" movies have performed together. The scene was filmed in Los Angeles by second-unit director Doug Dillaman. However, the scene was eventually deleted, with only a separate cameo scene with Danielle left in the film.
