= Room Full of Spoons =

2016 Canadian documentary film

- Film poster
- Directed by: Rick Harper
- Written by: Rick Harper
- Starring: Juliette Danielle; Philip Haldiman; Scott Holmes; Dan Janjigian; Carolyn Minnott; Robyn Paris; Michael Rousselet; Doug Walker; Sandy Schklair; Kyle Vogt
- Narrated by: Rick Harper
- Cinematography: Martin Racicot
- Edited by: Fernando Forero
- Music by: Mladen Milicevic
- Production companies: RockHaven Pictures; Parktown Studios
- Distributed by: RockHaven Pictures
- Release date: April 2016
- Running time: 113 minutes
- Country: Canada
- Language: English

Room Full of Spoons is a 2016 Canadian documentary film directed by Rick Harper about the 2003 cult film The Room. Harper, who is a longtime associate of the American actor and filmmaker Tommy Wiseau, attempts to document his personal life and The Room's cult film status. After a brief theatrical run in April 2016, the documentary was quickly pulled when independent theaters reported receiving legal notices of copyright infringement from Wiseau.

== Synopsis ==
Rick Harper, "Canadian documentary maker and The Room superfan", a longtime associate of Tommy Wiseau, director of the infamous 2003 film The Room, explores the story behind the film's troubled production and researches Wiseau's mysterious background, concluding that he is Polish and originally from the city of Poznań.

== Cast ==
- Rick Harper
- Juliette Danielle
- Philip Haldiman
- Carolyn Minnott
- Robyn Paris
- Scott Holmes
- Dan Janjigian
- Kyle Vogt
- Sandy Schklair
- Michael Rousselet
- Doug Walker
- Alan Bagh

== Production ==
Ottawa filmmaker Rick Harper, with Fernando Forero, Martin Racicot and Richard Towns, formed Rockhaven Pictures.

== Release ==
On February 10, 2016, Rick Harper introduced Room Full of Spoons at University of Sheffield Students' Union, with questions and answers with Ryan Finnigan, author of The Room: The Definitive Guide.

== Legal issues ==
After a brief theatrical run in April 2016, the documentary was quickly pulled when independent theaters reported receiving legal notices of copyright infringement from Tommy Wiseau, the director, writer, producer, and star of The Room. Another attempt to release the film in 2017 to capitalize on the film The Disaster Artist was stymied by Wiseau, who filed an injunction in Ontario courts, preventing a DVD release of the film and setting up a lengthy legal battle. After a final trial in January 2020, the Ontario Superior Court of Justice judge Paul Schabas ruled in favour of the makers of Room Full of Spoons, therefore allowing the film to be marketed and released. He ordered Wiseau to pay the filmmakers US$550,000 in compensatory damages, CA$200,000 in punitive damages, and defendants' court costs.

Wiseau Studio appealed the Superior Court of Ontario's April 2020 judgment. On January 15, 2021, a judge of the Court of Appeal for Ontario ordered security for a trial judgment pending appeal, the first such order in the history of the jurisdiction. Wiseau appealed the order to a panel of the same court, which overturned the order for security for judgment but affirmed the order for security for costs, dismissing Wiseau's appeal for failure to comply with the latter; the Supreme Court denied leave to appeal.

== See also ==
- Best Worst Movie
