= Mladen Milicevic =

American classical composer

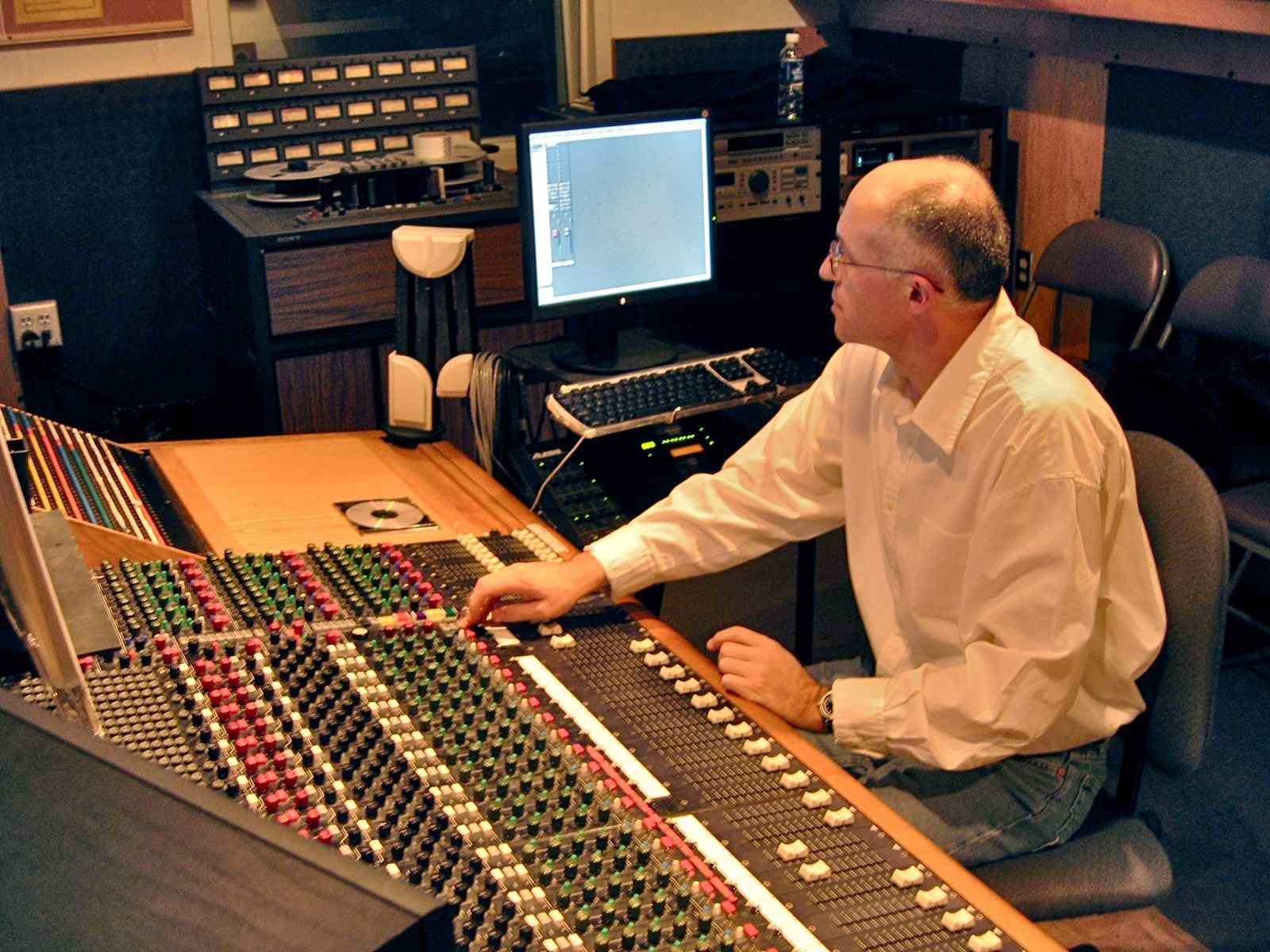
- Milicevic in 2004
- Born: 1958 (age 67–68); Sarajevo, Bosnia and Herzegovina, Yugoslavia
- Citizenship: American; Bosnian
- Occupations: Musician; film composer

Mladen Milicevic (born 1958) is a Bosnian composer of experimental music, sound installation, and film music. He is a professor and has been for many years the Chair of the Recording Arts Department at Loyola Marymount University in Los Angeles. He is best known for composing the score to the cult film The Room.

== Early life and education ==
Born into a family of film-makers; his father was a cinematographer and his mother Zlata was a film editor). Milicevic started playing piano when he was 6. He received a B.A. in music composition (1982) and an M.A. (1986) in music composition and multimedia arts from the Sarajevo Music Academy, in his native Bosnia and Herzegovina, where he studied with Josip Magdic. Milicevic came to the United States in 1986 to study with Alvin Lucier at Wesleyan University in Connecticut, where he received his M.A. in experimental music composition (1988). After Wesleyan, he went to study at the University of Miami in Florida, where he received his PhD in computer and experimental music composition in 1991. He also studied for several summers at the Aspen Music School/Festival with Michael Czajkowski.

== Career ==
In the nineties, Milicevic has concentrated on live interactive electronic music composition utilizing hyperinstruments. He was awarded several music prizes for his compositions in the former Yugoslavia as well as in Europe. Milicevic worked in Yugoslavia as a freelance composer for 10 years, where he composed for theater, films, radio and television, also receiving several prizes for this body of work. Since he moved to the United States in 1986, Milicevic has performed his live electronic music, composed for modern dances, made several experimental animated films and videos, set up installations and video sculptures, had exhibitions of his paintings, and scored for films. His film music can be heard at his website.

=== Commercial work ===
In the former Yugoslavia, Milicevic (using the alias Igor Krik) produced the 1985 pop band, VALENTINO, that sold platinum. In 2003, he composed the score for the cult film The Room, directed by Tommy Wiseau. He later wrote the score for Wiseau's 2004 documentary Homeless in America, and in 2015, scored a documentary about The Room, titled Room Full of Spoons.

In 2009, he also produced an album entitled I've Got a Song for You by Rade Šerbedžija and Miroslav Tadić. For this work, he was nominated for the Porin award in Croatia as the best-produced album. He scored a documentary, Cuba: The Forgotten Revolution, which won an Emmy in 2016.
