= The Neighbors (2015 TV series) =

2010s American sitcom with limited release

- Promotional image for the pilot release
- Genre: Sitcom
- Created by: Tommy Wiseau
- Written by: Tommy Wiseau
- Directed by: Tommy Wiseau
- Starring: Tommy Wiseau
- Opening theme: "1812 Overture" by Pyotr Ilyich Tchaikovsky
- Country of origin: United States
- Original language: English
- No. of seasons: 1
- No. of episodes: 6

Production
- Executive producer: Tommy Wiseau
- Producer: Tommy Wiseau
- Cinematography: Various
- Editor: Various
- Running time: 22–32 minutes
- Production company: Wiseau-Films

Original release
- Network: Hulu
- Release: March 14 – May 26, 2015

The Neighbors is a comedy television series created, written, directed, produced by and starring Tommy Wiseau. In Wiseau's first project since his 2003 cult film The Room, The Neighbors follows the assorted tenants of an apartment building and their interactions with the "manager", Charlie, played by Wiseau. Four episodes were released on Hulu on March 14, 2015. Two additional episodes were released on May 26, 2015.

== Development ==
In 2007, Wiseau shot an original pilot episode for The Neighbors, which was never publicly released, although a trailer for it is available on YouTube.

On March 9, 2009, Wiseau appeared on the episode "Tommy" of Tim and Eric Awesome Show, Great Job!, the show of Tim Heidecker and Eric Wareheim, who comprise the comedy duo Tim & Eric and who had been involved in promoting The Room. In an interview later in 2009, Wiseau stated he would like to work with the duo again. In an interview on October 19 of that year, Tim & Eric stated they were developing two television series for Wiseau. On an interview from January 20, 2012, Tim & Eric stated they were no longer working with Wiseau on The Neighbors as he wanted their creative input and the duo wanted Wiseau to be the sole creative influence. Wiseau would later claim that working with Tim & Eric failed due to their jealousy of him and their desire to be too involved.

In 2011, Wiseau claimed he was working on a fifteen-episode contract with an unnamed television channel for The Neighbors.

On July 15, 2014, Wiseau began to advertise The Neighbors once more on the website for The Room, its own new website, on Facebook, and on YouTube. It was shown to the public in late September 2014. Wiseau would claim the pilot episode was shot a mere three weeks prior to its first airing. The 2014 pilot reuses the same characters and plot as the 2007 pilot, though with different actors and sets.

According to its end credits the show is "based on the novel by Tommy Wiseau", though said novel does not exist.

== Cast ==
Wiseau plays dual roles: Charlie, the main protagonist of the series, and (with a blonde wig) Ricky Rick, a petty criminal who serves as the series' primary antagonist. Of playing both roles, Wiseau said "I want to show people that I have range."

Robert Axelrod is depicted on the poster for the show, and credited on IMDb as "Prince George", a character who is discussed but does not appear in the six released episodes. Axelrod was a frequent collaborator of Tim's and Eric's.

== Episodes ==
Wiseau claimed shortly after the debut of the pilot episode that he had currently shot "potentially three, five" episodes. A press release claimed that Wiseau planned to write and direct "at least 20" episodes. In a January 2015 interview, Wiseau stated that only the pilot episode had been filmed, but that he was determined to film a second episode, and had scripts for ten. Two months later, the pilot and three additional episodes were released on Hulu. In an April 2015 interview, Wiseau stated that four more episodes would come to Hulu in the summer of 2015. On May 26, 2015, episodes five and six were released on Hulu. Wiseau had said that he had either an eight- or twelve-episode contract with Hulu.

== Release ==
The pilot episode was first shown attached to midnight screenings of The Room at the Landmark Sunshine Cinema in New York City from September 26–28, 2014. It continued to be shown exclusively through The Room midnight releases into 2015. Wiseau states he had a one-episode deal with Adult Swim, which aired Awesome Show and was the syndication debut of The Room, but he wanted to push for a better deal. Early advertisements for The Neighbors contained the logo of Comedy.TV, though it was never mentioned on their website.

On March 14, 2015, the pilot and three new episodes were released by Revolver Entertainment on Hulu. On May 26, 2015, episodes five and six were released on Hulu. According to Wiseau, this was so the show would be eligible for the 67th Primetime Emmy Awards, and he submitted them for nomination in six categories.

On October 20, 2015, the first six episodes were released on DVD as The Neighbors: The Complete Season One.

On April 3, 2016, season two of The Neighbors was announced by a trailer on the show's YouTube channel. On August 9, 2017, a post on the show's official Facebook page stated that season two would air "Later this year!!!" A trailer for season 2 was released on YouTube on November 21, 2017. As of 2026, no episodes have been released.

== Reception ==
Reviewing a screening of the pilot episode, The A.V. Club found the production values and acting quality of The Neighbors far worse than those of The Room, and noted the unexplained presence of women in bikinis in several scenes. Wiseau responded to the criticism by saying that the women were meant to be symbolic of sexually liberated women. The A.V. Club later reviewed the first four episodes made available on Hulu Plus, and summed up the series as an "unpleasant slog" that "actually gets lazier as it progresses", ultimately giving it an F grade.

Wiseau himself considers the fifth and sixth episodes better than the first four, and submitted the series for Emmy consideration.
