= Juliette Danielle =

American actress (born 1980)

- Born: Juliette Danielle Worden; December 8, 1980 (age 45); Fort Smith, Arkansas, U.S.
- Other name: Juliette Clark
- Occupation: Actress
- Years active: 2002–2003; 2012–2018
- Spouse: Joe Clark (m. 2017)
- Website: juliettedanielle.com

Juliette Danielle Worden (born December 8, 1980) is an American actress best known for portraying Lisa, the love interest of Johnny in the 2003 cult film The Room.

== Career ==
=== The Room ===
Danielle was the female lead in Tommy Wiseau's cult film The Room in which she plays the protagonist Johnny's (Wiseau) scheming fiancée, Lisa, although she was originally cast for the supporting role of Michelle.

The film was initially a notable failure, receiving abysmal reviews and exceedingly low box office returns. Shortly after the film, Danielle gave up acting to pursue other careers. However, the film went on to achieve cult success in various late night screenings, celebrating its disjointed dialogue and inconsistent plot. Like many of the film's other actors, including Wiseau himself and Greg Sestero, Danielle has embraced the following that the movie has achieved around the world, attending screenings and managing and using her Facebook page to interact with her fans.

Her favorite line from the movie is "Leave your stupid comments in your pocket."

One of her most notable scenes is during a conversation with the character Michelle, when a pronounced bulge on her neck appears several times under her red halter top. That particular scene has been focused on in commentary and audience viewings. Danielle was puzzled by the phenomenon saying, "Can I just tell you that I've spent hours in front of the mirror trying to replicate that on purpose? I have no idea what was going on."

=== Return to acting ===
In 2012, Danielle returned to acting and appeared in Dead Kansas, Ghost Shark 2: Urban Jaws and Till Morning.

== Personal life ==
Danielle spent most of her early life in Sugar Land, Texas, a suburb of Houston. She moved with her mother and sister to Los Angeles in the early 2000s and decided to pursue an acting career. In a Reddit AMA in 2012, she stated that she had been employed as a "marketing manager for a real estate development firm" for over ten years.

On July 7, 2017, Danielle married Joe Clark.

== Portrayal in The Disaster Artist ==
The 2017 film The Disaster Artist, starring James Franco, dramatizes the events around the making of The Room. Danielle is portrayed by Ari Graynor, though Britney Spears was briefly considered for the role.

== Filmography ==
Year	Film	Role	Note
2002	Tempus Fugit	College student	Short
2003	The Room	Lisa	
2013	Dead Kansas	Rebecca	
2013	Till Morning	Evie	Short
2015	Ghost Shark 2: Urban Jaws	Elsie Grey	
2018	Texas Cotton	Worker	
