= Dead Kansas =

2014 American web series

- Movie Poster
- Created by: Rotten Productions
- Written by: Aaron K. Carter; Nicholas A. DeNicola
- Directed by: Aaron K. Carter
- Starring: Irwin Keyes; Joe McQueen; Ben Woolf
- Country of origin: United States
- Original language: English
- No. of seasons: 1
- No. of episodes: 5

Production
- Producer: Rotten Productions
- Editor: Trevor Penna
- Running time: 64 minutes

Original release
- Network: YouTube
- Release: September 6, 2012 – October 17, 2013

Dead Kansas is a 2013 five-part webseries, written, directed, and produced by Aaron K. Carter.

== Plot ==
In a post-apocalyptic land consumed by Rottens, a simple farmer and his teenage daughter struggle to survive. Meanwhile, an unruly gang make a plan to kidnap and sell the daughter for their own selfish profit. With the farmer/gang confrontation, a wicked tornado approaching, and "Rottens" everywhere - who will get out alive?

== Cast ==
- Irwin Keyes as Giant
- Ben Woolf as Squeak
- Joe McQueen as Skinny
- Alexandria Lightford as Emma
- Erin Miracle as Emma
- Aaron Guerrero as Glenn
- Michael Camp as Jebediah
- Kevin Beardsley as Zeke / Rusty
- Tony Della Catena as Leo
- Darryl Dick as Dr. Emerson
- Juliette Danielle as Rebecca

== Filming locations ==
Dead Kansas was filmed in Los Angeles, California, primarily around the San Fernando Valley. A portion was filmed at a circus-themed bar called, California Institute of Abnormalarts. It is located at 11334 Burbank Blvd, in North Hollywood, California 91601. Every room is decorated with an eclectic assortment of ugly dolls, strange wall hangings, clowns, skeletons, and other spooky Halloween themed relics. CIA almost has a museum-like feel. Production was permitted only 4 hours to film there.

== Rottens ==
Zombies are referred to as "Rottens" in Dead Kansas. There is only one physical zombie, in full make-up, towards the end of the film. The other Rottens are never shown. They are only simulated via Point Of View (POV) in black & white. The camera acted as the Rotten's eyes in certain shots, while the actors reacted. As tempting as it was to use traditional make-up and show the Rottens, the director specifically chose POV to do something different. Dead Kansas is the first zombie film to extensively use POV.

== Release ==
The pilot of the webseries premiered on September 24, 2012 on YouTube. All five acts were eventually tied together and released on DVD as a full-length film in October 2013. The film version of the series, screened at the 2014 FANtastic Horror Film Festival - where it won an award for Best Zombie Film. Dead Kansas was released on Amazon Video, February 26, 2015.

== Soundtrack ==
The punk-rock music heard throughout the film is from the band Power Of Aggression. They are from the Hollywood area and were active during 1999 through the early 2000s. The band was originally called Gauntlet in the early-90s with former members Daniel Gallagher & Eddy Darbinian on guitars with Matthew Muller on bass guitar. The band eventually reformed in 1999, changed their name to Power of Aggression and adopted most of the songs from Gauntlet. Original member and chief-songwriter Anthony Robinson played lead guitar & vocals, Adam Ledezma played drums and Aaron K. Carter played bass guitar. When a soundtrack was needed, producers Aaron K. Carter and Adam Ledezma used the Power Of Aggression demo-tape that they recorded over a decade ago. The songs featured in Dead Kansas include: "The Ruler", "Walls Of Insanity", "Hate", "The Way We Feel", "Behold the Terror", and "Now". Composer Jonathan Price provided the rest of the music score.
