= Ben Woolf =

American actor (1980–2015)

- Woolf in 2013
- Born: Benjamin Eric Woolf; September 15, 1980; Fort Collins, Colorado, U.S.
- Died: February 23, 2015 (aged 34); Los Angeles, California, U.S.
- Occupation: Actor
- Years active: 2002–2015

Benjamin Eric Woolf (September 15, 1980 – February 23, 2015) was an American film and television actor. He is known for his roles in American Horror Story's first and fourth seasons, in which he played Infantata and Meep, respectively. He was also a pre-school teacher.

== Early life ==
Born September 15, 1980, Fort Collins, Colorado, in the United States, to parents Nicholas Woolf and author Marcy Luikart, Woolf grew up in Fairfield, Iowa. He moved with his family to Santa Barbara in 1999 where he was an active league pool player, improv theater performer, and karaoke enthusiast. He earned a degree in Early Childhood Education at City College, teaching in the Head Start program in Goleta until 2010, when he moved to Hollywood to pursue his dream of being an actor.

== Career ==
In 2002, Woolf began his acting career in his musical film debut "Tap". Woolf was featured in Dead Kansas, Insidious, Haunting Charles Manson, and Woggie. However, Woolf was perhaps best known for his role as The Infantata and Meep on the television series American Horror Story.

Of his love of pre-school teaching, Woolf said, "when you're with children, you kind of live in a different world that doesn't have any rules. It's more imagination."

== Personal life ==
Woolf was diagnosed with pituitary dwarfism at an early age. He stood at 4 feet 4 inches (1.32 meters) as an adult.

== Honors ==
Two weeks before he died Woolf was honored in Moscow for his contributions to the horror genre at the Russian Horror Film Awards.

== Death ==
Woolf died February 23, 2015, at age 34 from a stroke resulting from a head injury he received in a traffic accident while crossing the road. He was struck by the side-view mirror of a passing car in Los Angeles, California. Woolf later died at Cedars-Sinai Medical Center located in Los Angeles.

== Filmography ==
Year	Title	Role	Notes
2002	Tap	Dancing Boy	Film debut
2004	The Jets	Mike	Uncredited
2010	Insidious	Dancing Boy	Uncredited
2012	Woggie	Little Dude	
2013	Unlucky Charms	Pookah	
2013	Dead Kansas	Squeak	
2013	Behind the Scenes of Haunting Charles Manson	Himmler	
2013	Haunting Charles Manson	Himmler	
2015	Tales of Halloween	Rusty Rex	

=== Television ===
Year	Title	Role	Notes
2007	TV Face	Something	2 episodes
2011	American Horror Story: Murder House	Infantata	2 episodes
2012	Eagleheart	Frib	Episode: "Little Dude"
2012	Little People, Big Word	Self	Episode: "Amy's 50th"
2012	TMI Hollywood	Host	Episode: "Hungry Like the Woolf"
2014–15	American Horror Story: Freak Show	Meep	3 episodes
