= Ghost Shark =

2013 film by Griff Furst

- Written by: Paul A. Birkett; Eric Forsberg; Griff Furst
- Directed by: Griff Furst
- Starring: Mackenzie Rosman; Dave Randolph-Mayhem Davis; Sloane Coe
- Country of origin: United States
- Original language: English

Production
- Running time: 84 minutes
- Budget: $1.8 million

Original release
- Network: Syfy
- Release: August 22, 2013

Ghost Shark is a 2013 American supernatural horror comedy film directed for the Syfy television network by Griff Furst. With Furst joined by Paul A. Birkett and Eric Forsberg for screenwriting, the film premiered on Syfy on August 22, 2013.

Despite being panned critically, the film attracted attention on social media due to its fantastical premise. Websites such as Vulture commented on moments from the film.

A similar film, Ghost Shark 2: Urban Jaws, was released on July 1, 2015 following positive reception of a faux trailer posted to YouTube in 2010. The two films are unrelated, other than both being films featuring killer sharks.

== Plot ==
When a great white shark eats the potential catch of a sport fisherman, the man and his daughter violently retaliate by sadistically torturing and killing the shark. The shark's corpse then sinks to the bottom of an underwater cave. It is subsequently resurrected as a ghost due to the cave's mysterious paranormal properties.

Now hungry for revenge, the ghost shark eats its killers, along with the captain of their boat. It eventually sets its sights on the rest of the local community in the seaside town of Smallport, Florida. Due to the shark's new spectral form, it can attack and kill anyone as long as there is even the smallest amount of water nearby. This allows it to emerge from a swimming pool, a bathtub, a bucket, a metal pipe and even a drinking cup. It kills many people in several unexpected locations.

Though the terror is seemingly out of control, a group of young people trying to find answers end up having their pleas ignored. The local mayor is in the midst of his re-election campaign, and other authorities are unwilling to believe in the ghost. The teenager Ava Conte (Mackenzie Rosman) vows to put an end to the ghost shark, after it devours her father and several friends. She teams up with a local lighthouse keeper named Finch (Richard Moll). Finch is a drunken figure who claims to know the secrets to the shark's new-found form. Reportedly, when the cave was still above water, it was where a dying African-American slave put a voodoo curse on the entire town.

After being arrested, harassed, threatened, and otherwise impeded in their struggles, the group finally manages to lay the creature to rest.

== Cast ==
- Mackenzie Rosman as Ava Reid
- Dave Randolph-Mayhem Davis as Blaise Parker
- Lucky Johnson as Mayor Frank Stahl
- Shawn C. Phillips as Mick
- Richard Moll as Finch
- Sloane Coe as Cicely Reid
- Jaren Mitchell as Cameron Stahl
- Tim Taylor as Deputy Hendricks
- Thomas Francis Murphy as Chief Martin

== Reception ==
Critical reception for Ghost Shark has been predominantly negative. The film holds a rating of 29% on review aggregator website Rotten Tomatoes, based on 7 reviews, with an average score of 5.2/10. On Metacritic, the film has a weighted average score of 32 out of 100, based on 10 critics, indicating "generally unfavorable" reviews. For example, critic Jim Vorel, writing for Paste, blasted the film as "a mind-numbing movie", featuring severe problems "[f]rom its performances to its horrendous execution in the editing room". He concluded, "the film violates the most crucial rule of trashy filmmaking— you can be stupid, but don't be boring." Vorel particularly criticized the fact that the character of Cicily, played by Sloane Coe, is filmed in a sexually suggestive manner in several scenes despite the fact that she is identified as being too young to have a driver’s license (and is presumably under the age of consent).

One of the rare mixed to positive reviews for Ghost Shark came from Horrornews.net, with the film given a five out of ten score. The film was labeled as featuring both "[s]pecial effects that would make a film student cringe", but also a "well experienced cast mixed with fresh faced and eager newcomers." The film was compared, both positively and negatively, to an episode of one of the Scooby-Doo cartoons. Also, in spite of being panned critically, the film had some success attracting social media attention, with websites such as Vulture.com and the YouTube channel Fact Fiend with Karl Smallwood commenting on moments from the film.

== See also ==
- Ghost Shark 2: Urban Jaws
- List of killer shark films
