= Dan Janjigian =

Armenian-American former bobsledder, former actor & political candidate (born 1972)

Personal information
- Born: April 30, 1972 (age 54) Chicago, Illinois, U.S.
- Education: California Polytechnic State University
- Height: 6 ft 3 in (1.91 m)
- Weight: 198 lb (90 kg)

Sport
- Country: Armenia
- Sport: Bobsleigh
- Event: Two-man bobsleigh

Daniel Armen Janjigian (Armenian: Դանիէլ Ջանջիգեան; born April 30, 1972) is an Armenian-American former bobsledder, former actor, and political candidate. He competed at the 2002 Winter Olympics, representing Armenia. He earned 33rd place in the two-man bobsleigh event with Yorgo Alexandrou. As an actor, he portrayed Chris-R in the 2003 cult film The Room. He ran as a candidate for Texas's 31st congressional district in the 2020 elections.

== Biography ==
=== Early life ===
Janjigian was born on April 30, 1972, in Chicago, Illinois. His ancestors, ethnic Armenians from Samsun and Trabzon in modern-day Turkey, survived the Armenian genocide and subsequently emigrated to the United States. He was raised in Saratoga, California, his parents running an Armenian restaurant in nearby Sunnyvale. He graduated from Saratoga High School in 1991, later graduating with a degree in business administration from California Polytechnic State University in San Luis Obispo in 1996. After graduating, he worked at Microsoft for a number of years.

=== 2002 Winter Olympics ===
Janjigian developed an interest for bobsledding after meeting Greek Olympic bobsledder John-Andrew Kambanis at a mutual friend's wedding and attending the Olympic Bobsledding School in Calgary. He, along with Yorgo Alexandrou, competed in the two-man bobsleigh event at the 2002 Winter Olympics in Salt Lake City, Utah, for Armenia. Originally, Janjigian's brakeman was going to be Ara Bezdjian, but he had to be replaced due to a back injury. He then recruited a weightlifting champion from Armenia, but his visa application was cancelled in the aftermath of the September 11 attacks. Despite both being American citizens and Alexandrou being of Greek descent rather than of Armenian descent, they were granted Armenian residency in order to be eligible to participate.

They notably practiced on the streets of San Jose, California, on a bobsled fitted with wheels, which commentators noted was reminiscent of the famous Jamaican bobsledding team at the 1988 Winter Olympics. This was due to the lack of a proper venue that was available for them to train in as well as financial constraints. They finished in 5th place in the qualifying rounds, only qualifying in their last run. Despite garnering media attention nationally, Janjigian and Alexandrou finished 33rd in the actual event. Janjigian retired from bobsledding in 2007 after crashing and dislocating his shoulder.

=== Acting career ===
After the Olympics, Janjigian moved to Los Angeles and began a career in acting. His most notable work is that of portraying the violent drug dealer Chris-R in the 2003 cult film The Room. His debut acting role, Janjigian was the roommate of the actor originally cast to play Mark, a man only identified as Dan (or Don, as director Tommy Wiseau mistakenly referred to him). He was suggested despite the proposal by Wiseau to cast Scott Holmes, who had already portrayed the character Mike within the film, to play Chris-R with a disguise so as to distinguish him from his original character.

His other works include the Seth Landau film Take Out, as well as a mockumentary about the whereabouts of actors from The Room 15 years after the film's release, The Room Actors: Where Are They Now?, directed by Robyn Paris, who played Michelle in The Room. He also appeared in a 2013 episode of Wheel of Fortune, coming in third in that episode. In the 2017 movie adaptation of The Disaster Artist, a book by fellow actor Greg Sestero about the making of The Room, Janjigian is portrayed by Zac Efron.

=== Political career ===
In September 2019, Janjigian filed to run as a Democrat for the U.S. House of Representatives in the 2020 election. He was campaigning to be the Democratic nominee against Republican incumbent John Carter to represent the 31st district, based in the Austin metro area. His campaign material often referenced both his career as a bobsledder and as an actor. Janjigian was eliminated in the primaries, coming in last. Janjigian endorsed computer engineer Donna Imam over physician Christine Eady Mann in the primary runoff. Two of his other primary opponents, singer-songwriter Eric Hanke and Round Rock councilwoman Tammy Young, also endorsed Imam, who would go on to win the runoff and lose in the general election to Carter.

== Personal life ==
As of February 2020, Janjigian is a sales and management consultant and lives in Leander, Texas with his daughter, having moved to the Austin area in 2005. He speaks fluent Armenian and holds dual citizenship in Armenia and the United States. He authored sections of the 2015 Jack Canfield book The Soul of Success Volume 2.

== Filmography ==
=== Film ===
Year	Title	Role
2003	The Room	Chris-R
2003	Irangeles	Jock
2005	Take Out	Construction Worker
2016	Room Full of Spoons	Himself

=== Television ===
Year	Title	Role	Notes
2013	Wheel of Fortune	Himself	Game show
2018	The Room Actors: Where Are They Now?	Himself	Web mini-series
