= Tommy Wiseau =

American actor and filmmaker (born 1955)

- Wiseau in 2024
- Born: Tomasz Wieczorkiewicz; Europe
- Citizenship: United States
- Occupations: Actor; director; writer; producer
- Years active: 1979–present
- Known for: The Room; Big Shark; Best F(r)iends
- Website: tommywiseau.com

Signature
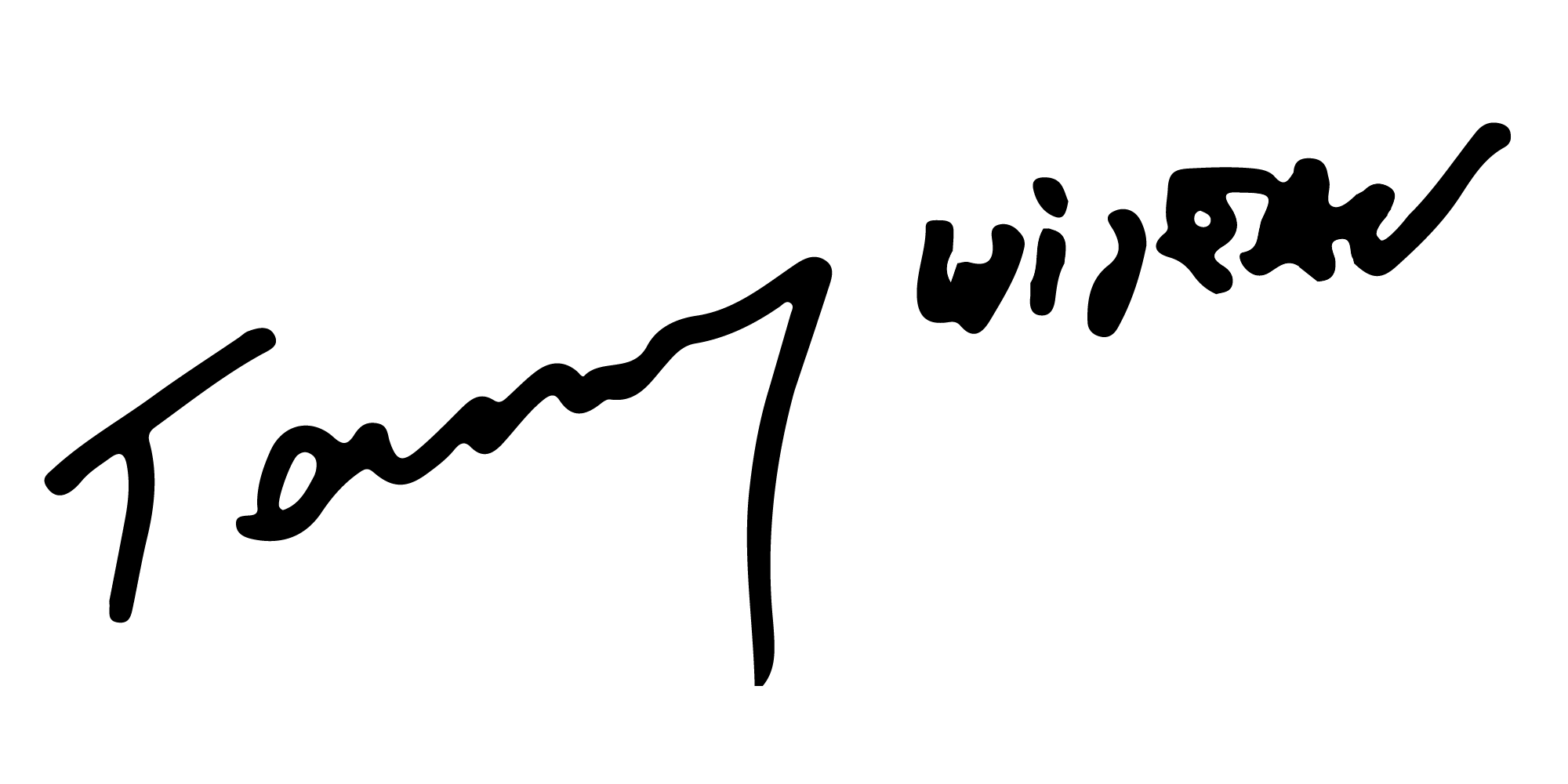

Thomas Pierre Wiseau (/wɪˈzoʊ/ wiz-OH or /ˈwaɪzoʊ/ WY-zoh; born Tomasz Wieczorkiewicz; October 3, 1955) is an American actor and filmmaker. He is best known for directing, writing, producing, and starring in the 2003 film The Room, which has been described by many critics as one of the worst films ever made and has gained cult status. He also co-directed the 2004 documentary Homeless in America and created the 2015 sitcom The Neighbors.

Some details about Wiseau's personal life (including his age, source of wealth, and background) remain unknown to the general public, with conflicting details leading to fan speculation and various conflicting reports. The 2013 non-fiction book The Disaster Artist: My Life Inside The Room, the Greatest Bad Movie Ever Made by Greg Sestero, as well as its 2017 film adaptation, chronicles the making of The Room, intertwined with Wiseau's life behind the scenes.

== Background ==
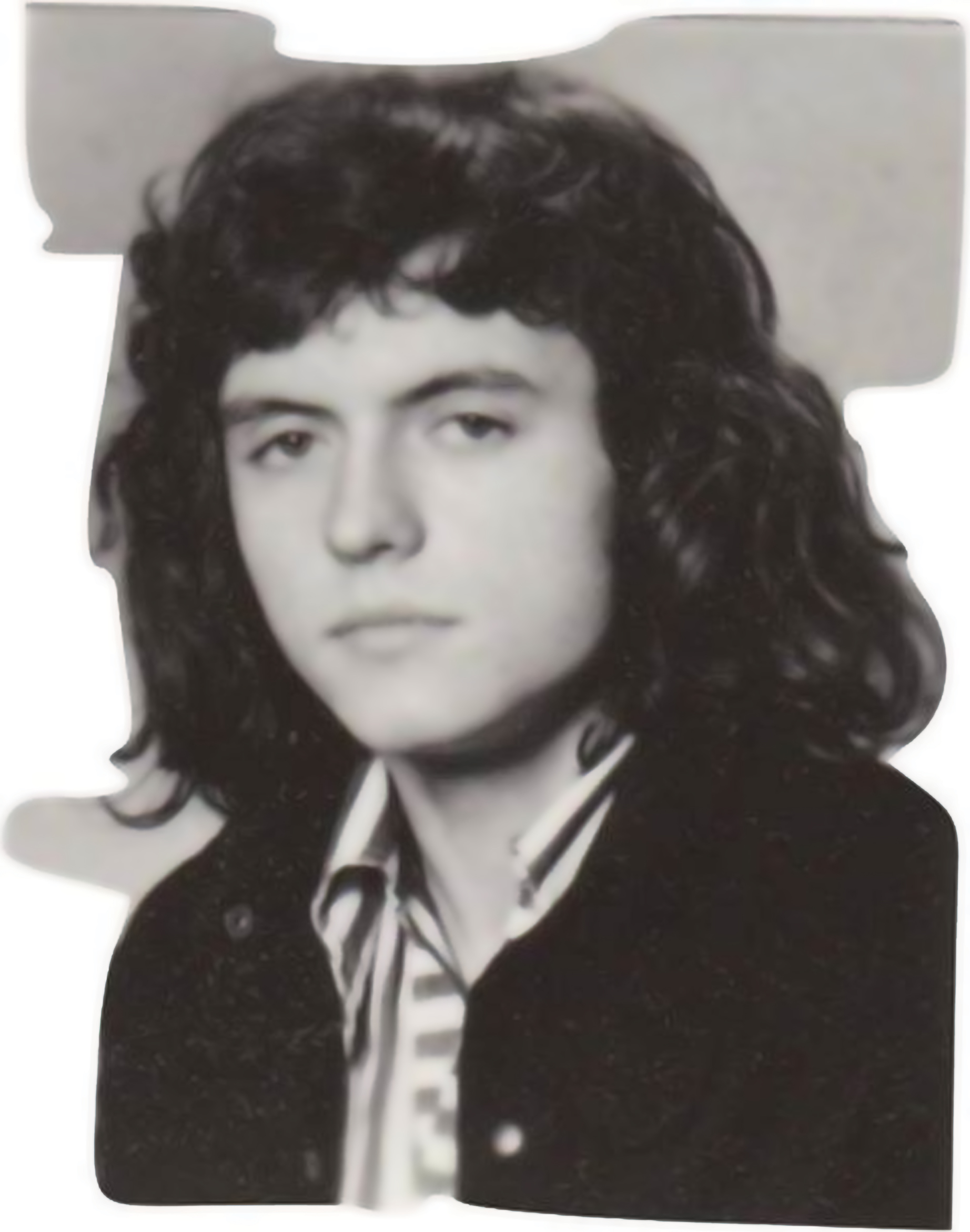
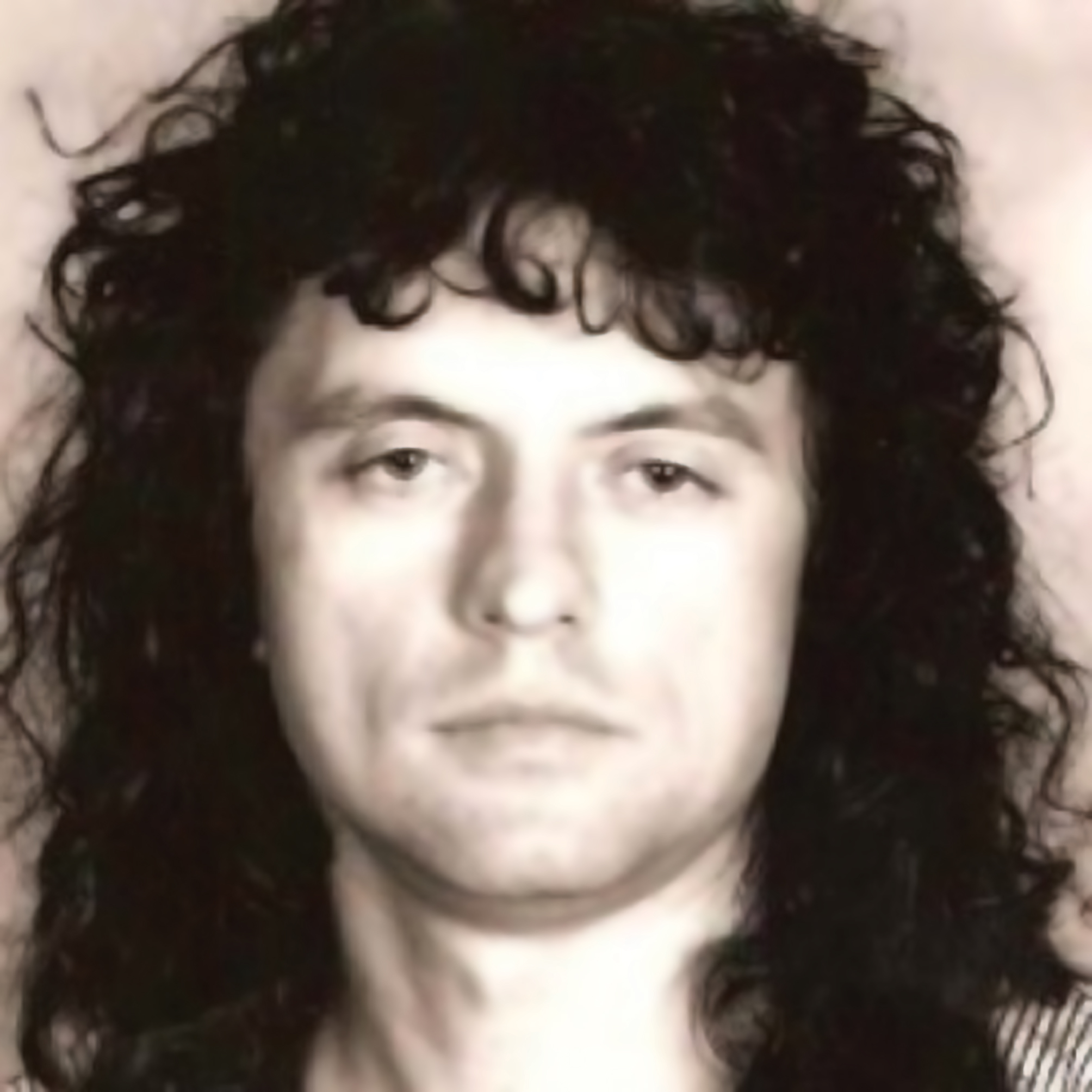
Two undated headshots of Wiseau from his Flickr account

Wiseau maintains privacy regarding his early life. He has claimed to have lived in France "a long time ago"; claimed he grew up in New Orleans; and described having "an entire family" in the New Orleans suburb of Chalmette, Louisiana. In a 2010 interview with Crikey, Wiseau gave an age which would indicate he was born in 1968 or 1969, but Greg Sestero claims in his 2013 memoir The Disaster Artist that his brother's girlfriend obtained copies of Wiseau's U.S. immigration papers and found that Wiseau was born "much earlier" than he claimed, in an Eastern Bloc country in the mid- to late-1950s.

In his 2016 documentary Room Full of Spoons, Rick Harper, a longtime associate of Wiseau, claimed to have researched Wiseau's background and concluded that he was born in 1955 in Poznań, Poland, and that his birth name was Tomasz Wieczorkiewicz. In November 2017, Wiseau confirmed publicly for the first time that he is originally from Europe: "Long story short, I grew up in Europe a long time ago, but I'm American and very proud of it."

In The Disaster Artist, Sestero asserted that Wiseau revealed to him—through "fantastical, sad, self-contradictory stories"—that as a young adult he moved to Strasbourg, France, where he adopted the name "Pierre" and worked as a restaurant dishwasher. According to Sestero, Wiseau described being wrongfully arrested following a drug raid at a hostel and being traumatized by his mistreatment by the French police, which led him to immigrate to the United States to live with an aunt and uncle in Chalmette. These claims have not been verified.

Sestero stated that after Wiseau lived in Louisiana for some amount of time, he subsequently moved to San Francisco, where he worked as a street vendor selling toys to tourists near Fisherman's Wharf. Wiseau supposedly gained the nickname "The Birdman" for his bird toys, which were only popular in Europe at the time; this led him to legally change his name when he became a U.S. citizen to Thomas Pierre Wiseau, taking the French word for "bird" (oiseau) and replacing the O with the W of his birth name.

Around this time, Wiseau also claims to have obtained a degree in psychology from Laney College in Oakland, California, asserting that he had graduated on the honor roll.

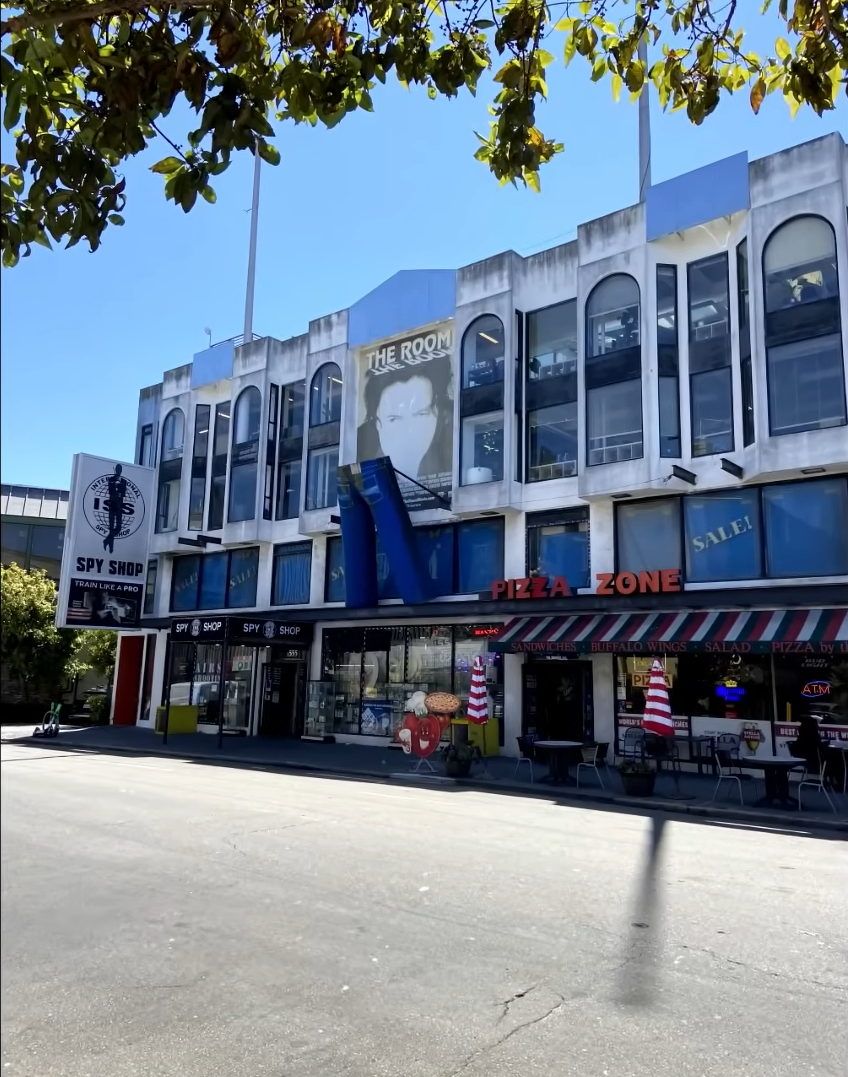
A photo of Wiseau's "Street Fashions USA" in San Francisco

According to Sestero, Wiseau claims to have worked a variety of jobs in the San Francisco Bay Area, including restaurant busboy and hospital worker, and ran a business called "Street Fashions USA" at Fisherman's Wharf, employing comedian Aaron Barrett and selling irregular blue jeans at discounted prices. He then claims to have eventually purchased and rented out large retail spaces in and around San Francisco and Los Angeles, making him independently wealthy. A 1994 article in the San Francisco Examiner identifies Wiseau as the owner of Street Fashions. Sestero states that the idea of Wiseau becoming wealthy so quickly via the jobs he claims to have had is so unlikely that he himself finds it impossible to believe. He notes that many people involved with the creation of The Room believed the film to be part of a money laundering scheme for organized crime, but Sestero himself considers this unlikely.

Wiseau claims to have been involved in a near-fatal car crash in California after another driver ran a red light and struck Wiseau's vehicle; as a result, Wiseau was hospitalized for several weeks. Sestero suggests that this incident was the turning point in Wiseau's life that led him to pursue his dreams of becoming an actor and director, ambitions that he had long neglected while pursuing financial security.

== Career ==
=== Film ===
==== Influences and early work ====
Wiseau has stated that he has been influenced by the films The Guns of Navarone and Citizen Kane, and specifically the actors James Dean and Marlon Brando. According to Sestero, the infamous line "You are tearing me apart, Lisa!" in The Room was based on Dean's cry of "You're tearing me apart!" in Rebel Without a Cause. Wiseau has also cited the influence of Tennessee Williams, Orson Welles, Elizabeth Taylor, and Alfred Hitchcock.

Sestero notes that Wiseau had been "trying to bust in" to Hollywood since the late 1980s, and recounts being shown an undated VHS tape of Wiseau in Vincent Chase's acting class (with whom Wiseau had a contentious relationship). He was allegedly enrolled in Chase's program around 1994 and attended film classes at Los Angeles Community College.

During this time, Wiseau directed a student film, Robbery Doesn't Pay, shot with a Super 8 camera in Westwood, Los Angeles. The film, which does not star Wiseau, has been described by Sestero as "just a dude walking around looking at cars to 'Blue Monday' by Orgy."

==== The Room ====
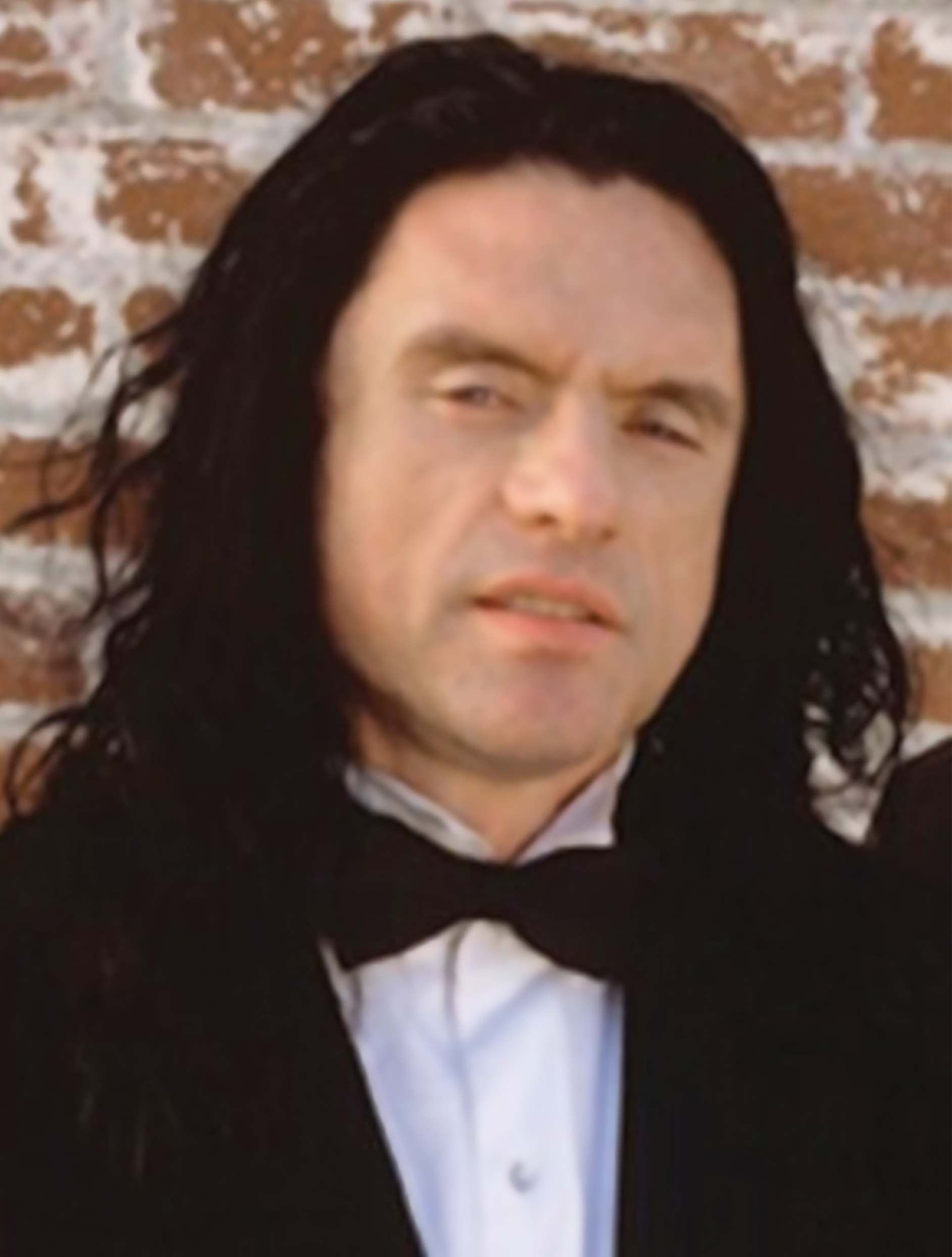
Wiseau in a promotional image for The Room as "Johnny", the lead character of the film

Wiseau's film The Room was released in 2003. Its budget was $6 million, the financing of which has remained a source of intrigue. The film was based on an unpublished 540-page novel written by Wiseau. The movie was immediately lambasted by critics, but became a "cult classic" with late-night showings at theaters around the world.

Audience members typically arrive dressed like their favorite characters, interact with the dialogue on screen, and throw plastic cutlery and footballs around the theater in reference to on-screen events. This attention grew into what was dubbed The Room's 2010–2011 "Love is Blind" International Tour, with the movie being screened in the United Kingdom, Germany, Denmark, Australia and India, among other locations. Wiseau appeared at many of these events, posing for photographs with fans and addressing the audience before some screenings.

In the 2017 film adaptation of Sestero's memoir The Disaster Artist, James Franco portrays Wiseau, for which he won the Golden Globe Award for Best Actor – Motion Picture Musical or Comedy. Wiseau approved of the choice, as well as that of Dave Franco as Sestero. Wiseau makes a cameo appearance in a post-credits scene as Henry.

==== Later film projects (2004–present) ====
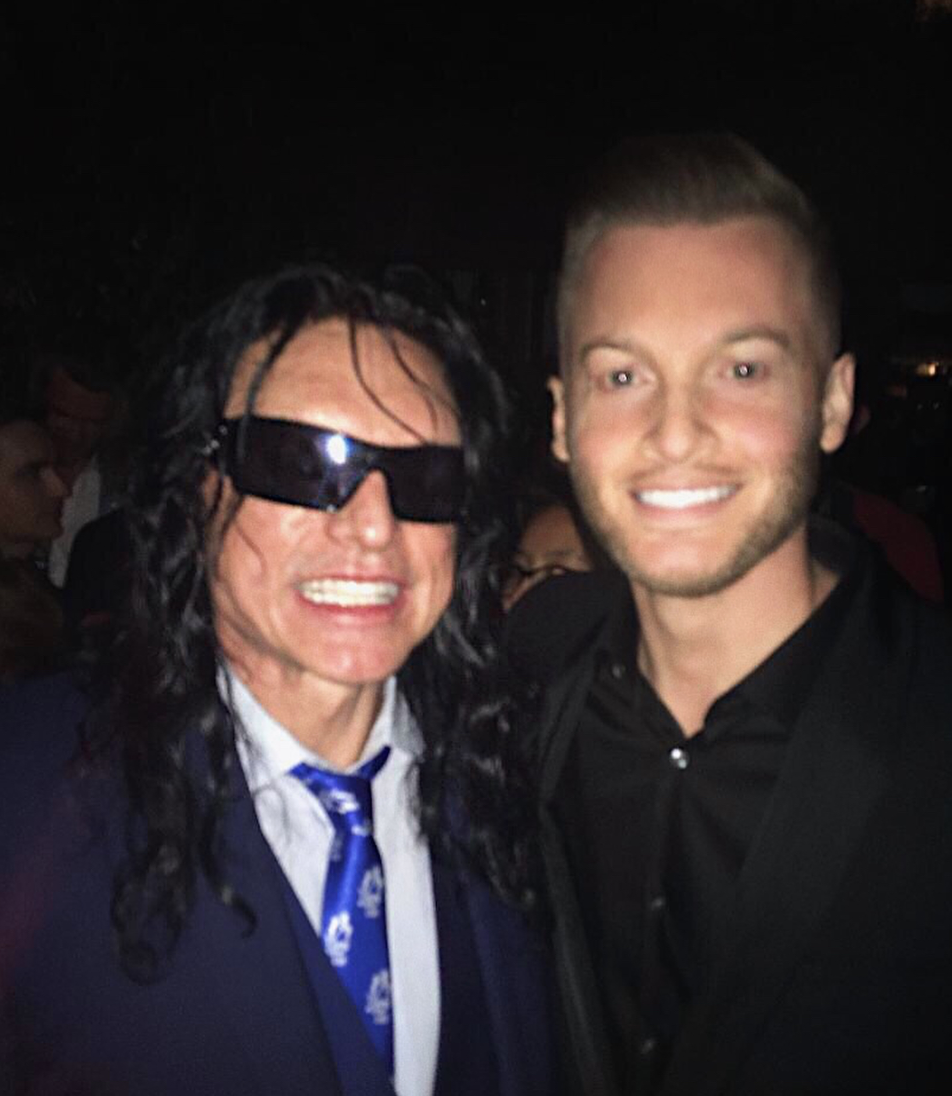
Wiseau (left) at a showing of The Disaster Artist, with the executive producer, John Powers Middleton, in 2017

In 2004, Wiseau produced and appeared in a short documentary, Homeless in America. In 2010, he starred in a 15-minute parody horror film entitled The House That Drips Blood on Alex. In September 2015, Wiseau expressed interest in directing a sequel to Fantastic Four (2015), having personal admiration for the film.

He was featured as the villain Linton Kitano in Samurai Cop 2: Deadly Vengeance, the sequel to the cult classic Samurai Cop. In October 2016, it was announced that Wiseau and Sestero would star in a movie called Best F(r)iends. The movie was written by Sestero and was shot in secret in Los Angeles. The film premiered September 4, 2017 at the Prince Charles Cinema. The first volume of the film was released on March 30, 2017, and volume two was released on June 1 of that same year.

In early February 2019, Wiseau revealed a teaser trailer for his second directorial effort, Big Shark. The trailer features Wiseau, Sestero, Isaiah LaBorde, and a big shark. In a Q&A session afterwards, Sestero said the film was intended to premiere in September 2019, but could not be finished on time. Big Shark had its world premiere on April 2, 2023 at Cinema 21 in Portland, Oregon. In 2020 Sestero stated that he and Wiseau would star in an upcoming UFO film.

=== Television ===
In 2008, Wiseau produced and appeared in the pilot episode of a television series called The Neighbors. A trailer for The Neighbors showed a series of clips set in an office. The show's website, accompanied by trailers and announcements at The Room showings in 2015, stated that the show was coming to various media distribution outlets in March 2015. The first four episodes were released on Hulu on March 14, 2015. Two additional episodes were released two months later, on May 26.

The next year, Wiseau guest-starred in an episode of Tim and Eric Awesome Show, Great Job! titled "Tommy", wherein he guest-directed a segment titled "Pigman". After Wiseau expressed a desire to work with the titular duo of Tim Heidecker and Eric Wareheim again, they announced in 2009 that they were developing two series for him.

In 2010, Wiseau appeared in Marc Wootton's 2010 comedy TV series La La Land. In a mockumentary format, Wootton's character, Gary Garner, accepted a role in Wiseau's present production at the time. Wiseau kicked Wootton off the set after Wootton jokingly alluded to using production funds to buy instant lotto tickets.

=== Internet ===
In 2011, Wiseau starred in a YouTube web series, Tommy Explains it All, in which he explained his views on various topics ranging from Citizen Kane to the art of kissing. Also in 2011, Wiseau starred in segments on Machinima.com called The Tommy Wi-Show. The segments show Wiseau playing various video games, such as Mortal Kombat and Driver: San Francisco, and offering commentary. In 2019, Wiseau starred in the pilot for an animated webseries titled SpaceWorld. An advertisement for 1Password released in January 2024 features Wiseau.

== Personal life ==
Wiseau has sought to remain as private as possible regarding the details of his personal and family life, for a very long time his birth name and birthdate were largely unknown. In a 2017 interview with ‘’Entertainment Weekly’’, he stated, “I think private life should be private life, the professional life should be the professional life,” emphasizing his belief that he has the right to maintain that separation. During a 2016 interview with James Franco, Wiseau described Greg Sestero as his “best friend”. In a December 2017 interview on The Howard Stern Show, Wiseau claimed to speak fluent French and identified himself as a Catholic.

=== Legal issues ===
In early 2020, Wiseau was ordered by a Canadian judge to pay US$550,000 in lost revenue and CA$200,000 in punitive damages to the makers of the documentary Room Full of Spoons after Wiseau tried to block its release, feeling it depicted him in a negative way.

== Filmography ==
=== Film ===
Year	Title	Director	Writer	Producer	Actor	Role	Notes
2003	The Room	Yes	Yes	Yes	Yes	Johnny	Debut
2004	Homeless in America	Yes	Yes	Yes	Yes	Interviewer	Documentary
2010	The House That Drips Blood on Alex	No	No	No	Yes	Alex	Short film
2011	Bump	No	No	No	Yes	Rick	Short film
2015	Samurai Cop 2: Deadly Vengeance	No	No	Executive	Yes	Linton Kitano	
2016	Cold Moon	No	No	No	Yes	Rodeo Official	Cameo
2016	Enter the Samurai	No	No	No	Yes	Himself	
2017	The Disaster Artist	No	No	No	Yes	Henry	Uncredited cameo
2018	Best F(r)iends	No	No	No	Yes	Harvey Lewis	
2023	Big Shark	Yes	Yes	Yes	Yes	Patrick	
2025	The Room Returns!	No	Yes	No	No		
TBA	Untitled UFO film	No	No	No	Yes		Pre-production

=== Television ===
Year	Title	Director	Writer	Producer	Actor	Role	Notes
2009	Tim and Eric Awesome Show, Great Job!	Yes	No	No	Yes	Himself / Pig Man	Episode: "Tommy" (segment "Pig Man")
2010	La La Land	No	No	No	Yes	Himself	Episode: "1.6"
2015	The Neighbors	Yes	Yes	Yes	Yes	Charlie/Ricky Rick	6 episodes Also creator and based on his novel

=== Web series ===
Year	Title	Role	Notes
2011–2012	The Tommy Wi-Show	Himself	
2011	Tommy Explains it All	Himself	
2016	Bee and PuppyCat	Boss (voice)	Episode: "Donut"
2018	Nerdist Presents	Joker	Video: "Tommy Wiseau's The Dark Knight"; Video: "Tommy Wiseau's Joker Audition Tape"
2019	SpaceWorld	TX (voice)	

=== Music videos ===
Year	Title	Artist
2018	"Role Models"	The Armed
2018	"Scary Love"	The Neighbourhood

== Awards and nominations ==
Year	Work	Award	Category	Result	Ref.
2004	Homeless in America	New York International Independent Film and Video Festival	Best Social Documentary (L.A. Festival)	Won	
2004	The Room	New York International Independent Film and Video Festival	Audience Award – Feature (Miami Festival)	Won	
2010	—N/a	Harvard's Ivory Tower (Harvard Undergraduate Television) Filmmaker of the Year	—N/a	Won	

== See also ==
- Room Full of Spoons, documentary about Wiseau
