= The Room =

2003 film by Tommy Wiseau

- Theatrical release poster
- Directed by: Tommy Wiseau
- Written by: Tommy Wiseau
- Produced by: Tommy Wiseau
- Starring: Tommy Wiseau; Greg Sestero; Juliette Danielle; Philip Haldiman; Carolyn Minnott
- Cinematography: Todd Barron
- Edited by: Eric Yalkut Chase
- Music by: Mladen Milicevic
- Production company: Wiseau-Films
- Distributed by: Chloe Productions; TPW Films
- Release date: June 27, 2003; (Los Angeles)
- Running time: 99 minutes
- Country: United States
- Language: English
- Budget: $6 million
- Box office: $5.3 million

The Room is a 2003 American romantic drama film (Note: Wiseau began describing The Room as a "black comedy" after it gained notoriety after its release.) written by, directed by, produced by, and starring Tommy Wiseau. The independent film also stars Juliette Danielle and Greg Sestero. Set in San Francisco, the film is centered on a melodramatic love triangle between amiable banker Johnny (Wiseau), his deceptive fiancée Lisa (Danielle), and his conflicted best friend Mark (Sestero). The work was reportedly intended to be semi-autobiographical. According to Wiseau, the title alludes to the potential of a room to be the site of both good and bad events. The stage play from which the film is derived was so named due to its events taking place entirely in a single room.

A number of publications have labeled The Room as one of the worst films ever made, one even describing it as "the Citizen Kane of bad movies". Originally shown only in a limited release in California, The Room quickly became a cult film due to its bizarre and unconventional storytelling, technical and narrative issues, and Wiseau's performance. Although Wiseau has retrospectively described the film as a black comedy, audiences have generally viewed it as a poorly made drama, an opinion shared by some of the cast. Although the film was a box-office bomb, home-media sales and notoriety following its initial release significantly increased its public profile.

The Disaster Artist, Sestero's memoir of the making of The Room, was co-written with Tom Bissell and published in 2013. A film of the same title based on the book, directed by and starring James Franco, was released in 2017; the book and film received widespread acclaim and numerous award nominations. A remake starring Bob Odenkirk was released in 2025; it was initially planned to be released in 2023, which would have coincided with the twentieth anniversary of The Room.

== Plot ==
Johnny is a successful banker who lives in a San Francisco townhouse with his fiancée Lisa, who has become disenchanted with their relationship. She seduces Johnny's best friend Mark, and the two begin a secret affair. After Johnny fails to get a promotion at work, Lisa tries to cheer him up by getting herself and Johnny drunk.

Johnny and Mark then rescue Denny, a neighboring college student whom Johnny financially and emotionally supports, from being shot by an armed drug dealer, Chris-R for owing him money. Denny later confesses to Johnny that he lusts after Lisa, and though he sympathizes with him, Johnny encourages him to pursue one of his classmates instead.

When Lisa starts falsely claiming that Johnny became physically abusive the night the two got drunk, Johnny becomes depressed and calls upon both Mark and his psychologist, Peter, for advice. Mark confides to Peter on the rooftop that he feels guilty about his affair. When Peter infers that the affair is with Lisa, Mark suspends him over the roof's edge before relenting.

After having overheard Lisa confessing her infidelity to her mother, Johnny attaches a tape recorder to their downstairs phone in an attempt to identify her lover by recording their phone conversations.

At a surprise birthday party for Johnny, Johnny's friend Steven catches Lisa and Mark kissing while the other guests are outside and chastises them. To distract Johnny, Lisa falsely claims that they are expecting a child, which Johnny announces to the party. At the end of the evening, Lisa and Mark flaunt their affair, leading to a physical altercation between Mark and Johnny, which culminates in Johnny kicking everyone out.

Johnny locks himself in the bathroom and berates Lisa for betraying him, prompting her to call Mark from the upstairs phone. Johnny retrieves the cassette recorder that he attached to the phone and listens to the intimate call. He has a nervous breakdown, furiously destroying his apartment, and commits suicide by shooting himself in the mouth. Lisa tells Mark that they are finally free to be together, but he rejects her, angry over her manipulative behavior towards Johnny. Together with Denny, they wait by Johnny's body for the police to arrive.

== Cast ==
- Tommy Wiseau as Johnny, a successful banker who is engaged to Lisa
- Juliette Danielle as Lisa, Johnny's fiancée who engages in an affair with Mark
- Greg Sestero as Mark, Johnny's best friend who is having an affair with Lisa
- Philip Haldiman as Denny, a young college student who is financially and emotionally supported by Johnny who lusts after Lisa.
- Carolyn Minnott as Claudette, Lisa's mother
- Robyn Paris as Michelle, Lisa's best friend and confidante
- Scott Holmes as Mike, Michelle's boyfriend and a friend of Johnny
- Dan Janjigian as Chris-R, a drug dealer who threatens to kill Denny
- Kyle Vogt as Peter, a psychologist and friend of Mark and Johnny
- Greg Ellery as Steven, a friend of Johnny and Lisa

== Production ==
=== Development ===
Tommy Wiseau wrote The Room as a play in 2001, after seeing the film The Talented Mr. Ripley. He then adapted the play into a book, which he was unable to get published. Frustrated, Wiseau instead decided to adapt the play into a film, producing it himself in order to maintain creative control.

Wiseau has been secretive about how he obtained funding for the project, but he told Entertainment Weekly that he made some of the money by importing leather jackets from Korea. According to The Disaster Artist (Greg Sestero's book based on the making of The Room), Wiseau was already independently wealthy at the time production began. Over several years, he claims to have amassed a fortune through entrepreneurship and real estate development in Los Angeles and San Francisco, a story Sestero found impossible to believe. Although many of the people involved with the project feared that the film was part of a money laundering scheme for organized crime, Sestero also found this possibility unlikely. Wiseau spent the entire US$6,000,000 (equivalent to about $10,500,000 in 2025) budget for The Room on production and marketing; Wiseau stated that the film was relatively expensive because many members of the cast and crew had to be replaced. According to Sestero, Wiseau made numerous poor decisions during filming that unnecessarily inflated the film's budget, such as building sets for sequences that could have been filmed on location, purchasing production equipment rather than renting it, and filming scenes multiple times using different sets. Wiseau also forgot his lines and place on camera, resulting in minutes-long dialogue sequences taking hours or days to shoot. Wiseau's antics on the set further caused the film's cost to skyrocket, according to Sestero.

According to Sestero and Greg Ellery, Wiseau rented a studio at the Birns & Sawyer film lot and bought a "complete Beginning Director package", which included two film and HD cameras; Wiseau was confused about the differences between 35 mm film and high-definition video, yet he wanted to be the first director to film an entire movie simultaneously in two formats. He achieved this goal by using a custom-built apparatus that housed both cameras side by side and required two crews to operate. However, only the 35 mm film footage was used in the final cut.

=== Casting ===
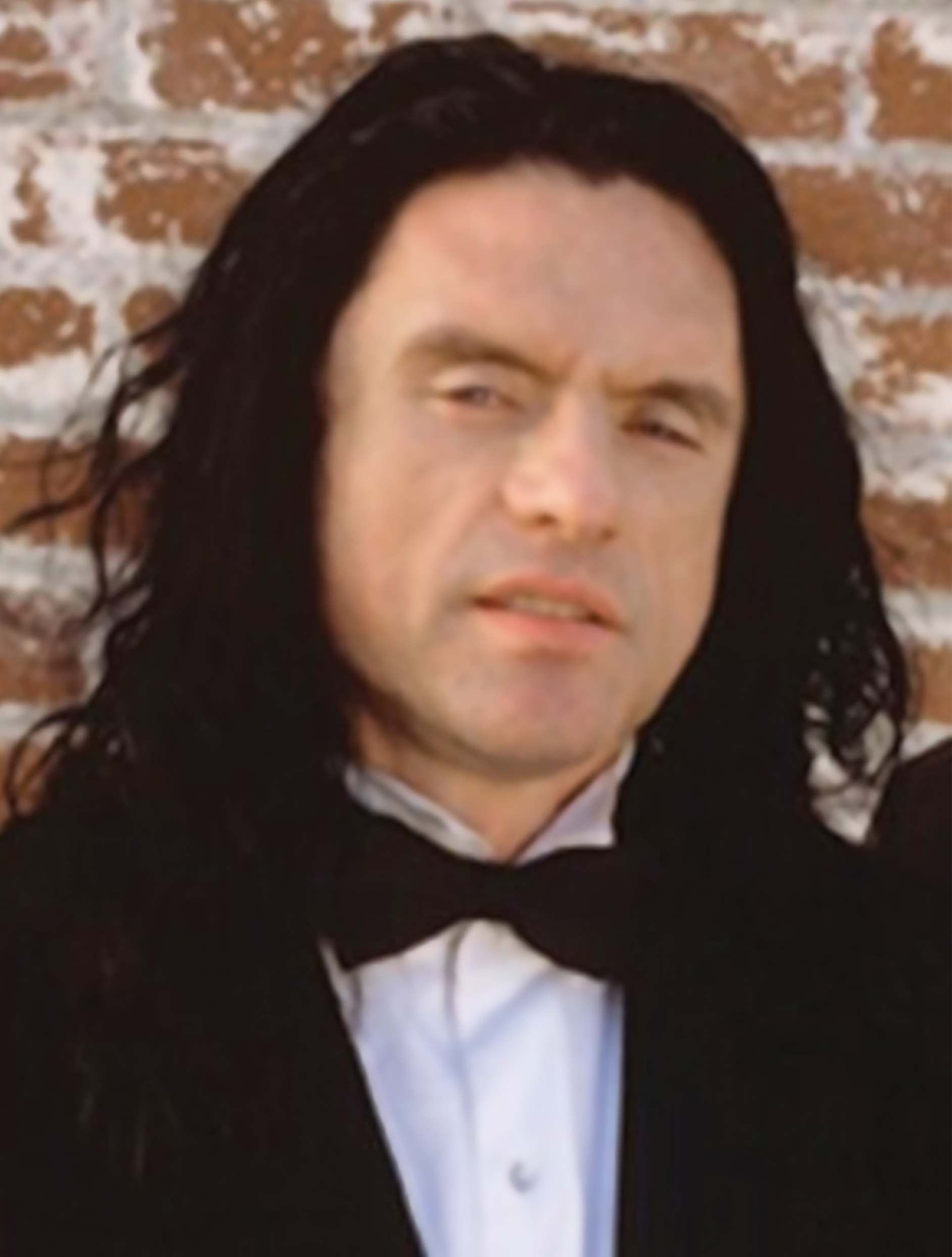
Tommy Wiseau in a promotional image for The Room as "Johnny", the lead character of the film

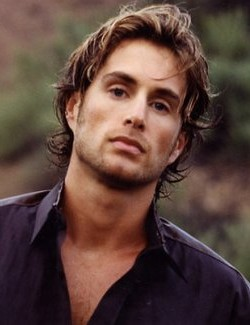
Greg Sestero, who portrayed Mark in The Room and served as its line producer, wrote The Disaster Artist based on his experiences working on the film.

Wiseau selected actors from thousands of head shots, although most of the cast had never been in a feature film prior to The Room. Sestero had limited film experience and agreed to work as part of the production crew only as a favor to Wiseau, whom he had been friends with for some time before production began. Sestero then agreed to play the character "Mark" after Wiseau fired the original actor on the first day of filming. Sestero was uncomfortable filming his sex scenes and was allowed to keep his jeans on while shooting them.

According to Greg Ellery, Juliette Danielle had "just gotten off the bus from Texas" when the shooting began, and "the cast watched in horror" as Wiseau jumped on Danielle, immediately beginning to film their "love scene". Sestero disputed this, stating that the sex scenes were among the last filmed. Wiseau said that Danielle was originally one of three or four understudies for the Lisa character and was selected after the original actress left the production. According to Sestero, the original actress was "Latina" and came from an unidentified South American country; according to Danielle, the actress was closer to Wiseau's age with a "random" accent. Danielle had been cast as Michelle but was given the Lisa role when the original actress was dismissed because her "personality... didn't seem to fit" the character. Danielle corroborates that multiple actors were dismissed from the production prior to filming, including another actress hired to play Michelle.

Dan Janjigian, who portrayed drug dealer Chris-R, was the roommate of the actor originally cast to play Mark, a man only identified as Dan (or Don, as director Wiseau mistakenly referred to him). He was suggested despite the proposal by Wiseau to cast Scott Holmes, who had already portrayed the character Mike within the film, to play Chris-R with a disguise so as to distinguish him from his original character.

Even though Kyle Vogt (who played Peter) told the production team that he had only a limited amount of time for the project, not all of his scenes were filmed by the time his schedule ran out. Despite the fact that Peter was to play a pivotal role in the climax, Vogt left the production; his lines in the last half of the film were given to Ellery, whose character is never introduced, explained, or addressed by name.

=== Writing ===
The original script was significantly longer than the one used and featured a series of lengthy monologues; it was edited on-set by the cast and script supervisor Sandy Schklair, who found much of the dialogue incomprehensible. An anonymous cast member told Entertainment Weekly that the script contained "stuff that was just unsayable. I know it's hard to imagine there was stuff that was worse. But there was." Sestero mentions that Wiseau was adamant characters say their lines as written, but that several cast members slipped in ad libs that made the final cut.

Much of the dialogue is repetitive, especially Johnny's. His speech contains several catchphrases: he begins almost every conversation with "Oh, hi!" or "Oh, hi [name of character]!". To dismissively end conversations, many characters use the phrase "Don't worry about it", and almost every male character discusses Lisa's physical attractiveness (including an unnamed character whose only line is "Lisa looks hot tonight"). Lisa often stops discussions about Johnny by saying "I don't want to talk about it."

In The Disaster Artist, Sestero recalls that Wiseau planned a subplot in which Johnny was revealed to be a vampire because of Wiseau's fascination with them. Sestero recounts how Wiseau tasked the crew with devising a way for Johnny's Mercedes-Benz to fly across the San Francisco skyline, revealing Johnny's vampiric nature.

=== Filming ===
Principal photography lasted four months. Shooting took place mainly on the Birns & Sawyer soundstage in Los Angeles, with some second unit shooting in San Francisco, California. The many rooftop sequences were shot on the soundstage, and exteriors of San Francisco were greenscreened in. A behind-the-scenes feature shows that some of the roof scenes were shot in August 2002. The film employed over 100 people, and Wiseau is credited as an actor, writer, producer, director, and executive producer. Other executive producer credits include Chloe Lietzke and Drew Caffrey. According to Sestero, Lietzke was Wiseau's ESL tutor and had no involvement in the film, and Caffrey, who had been an entrepreneurial mentor to Wiseau, died in 1999. Wiseau had several problems with his behind-the-camera team, and claims to have replaced the entire crew four times. He also assigned multiple (and often disparate) responsibilities to several crew members, a process Sestero described as "sandwich[ing] two roles into one" that frequently resulted in shooting delays: aside from playing the role of Mark, Sestero worked as the film's line producer, helped with casting, and assisted Wiseau; Schklair also served as a de facto first assistant director, and Birns & Sawyer sales representative Peter Anway acted as another assistant to Wiseau. Wiseau frequently forgot his lines or missed cues, and required numerous retakes and direction from Schklair and a stagehand named Byron; much of his dialogue had to be dubbed in post-production.

=== Soundtrack ===
The Room

Soundtrack album by Mladen Milicevic
- Released: 2003
- Genres: Film score, R&B
- Length: 56:28
- Label: TPW Records

The score was written by Mladen Milicevic, a music professor at Loyola Marymount University. Milicevic was approached by picture editor and sound designer Eric Chase to score the film, having worked with him on a previous film. Milicevic did not have much personal interaction with Wiseau during the writing process, and wrote his score through communication with Chase, who would relay creative notes to him from Wiseau. Milicevic later provided the score for Wiseau's 2004 documentary Homeless in America and Room Full of Spoons, a 2016 documentary on The Room.

The soundtrack features four R&B slow jams which play during four of the film's five love scenes; Michelle and Mike's oral sex scene uses only instrumental music. The songs are "I Will" by Jarah Gibson, "Crazy" by Clint Gamboa, "Baby You and Me" by Gamboa with Bell Johnson, and "You're My Rose" by Kitra Williams & Reflection. "You're My Rose" is also reprised during the end credits. The soundtrack was released by Wiseau's TPW Records in 2003.

All music is composed by Mladen Milicevic, except where noted.

No.	Title	Lead vocals	Length
1.	"The Room"		2:14
2.	"Red Dress"		1:09
3.	"I Will" (Kitra Williams, Jarah Gibson)	Wayman Davis	3:28
4.	"Lisa and Mark"		1:30
5.	"You're My Rose" (Kitra Williams, Wayman Davis)	Kitra Williams	2:22
6.	"Red Roses"		3:15
7.	"Street"		0:53
8.	"Life"		2:43
9.	"Street Two"		1:05
10.	"Crazy" (Clint Gamboa, Wayman Davis)	Clint Gamboa	2:52
11.	"Chocolate is the symbol of love."		1:52
12.	"Chris-R"		1:43
13.	"Reason"		0:52
14.	"Johnny Mark and Denny on the Roof"		1:09
15.	"Lisa, Michelle, and Johnny"		1:55
16.	"Yes or No"		1:20
17.	"I'll record everything."		1:13
18.	"XYZ"		1:05
19.	"Mark and Peter"		1:08
20.	"Jogging"		1:36
21.	"Baby You and Me" (Kitra Williams, Clint Gamboa, Jarah Gibson)	Clint Gamboa, Bell Johnson	3:17
22.	"Happy birthday, Johnny."		1:36
23.	"Lisa and Mark"		0:52
24.	"Fight During the Party"		1:16
25.	"Johnny in the Bathroom"		1:42
26.	"Tape Recorder"		3:56
27.	"Johnny Becomes Crazy"		2:48
28.	"Why? Why Johnny?"		2:39
29.	"Reflection (You're My Rose)" (Kitra Williams, Wayman Davis)	Kitra Williams	2:42
Total length:			56:28

=== Directorial credit dispute ===
In a 2011 Entertainment Weekly article, Schklair announced that he desired credit for directing The Room. Schklair told EW that Wiseau became too engrossed with his acting duties to direct the film properly and asked him to "tell the actors what to do, and yell 'Action' and 'Cut' and tell the cameraman what shots to get." The script supervisor also said that Wiseau asked Schklair to "direct [his] movie" but refused to give up the director title. This story is corroborated by one of the film's actors (who requested anonymity) and by Sestero in The Disaster Artist. Sestero describes Schklair taking charge of numerous sequences in which Wiseau found himself unable to remember lines or adequately interact with the rest of the cast, but jokes that claiming directorial credit was like "claiming to have been the Hindenburg's principal aeronautics engineer", and also notes that Schklair left the production before the end of principal photography in favor of the short film Jumbo Girl due to that project being shot by Janusz Kamiński. Wiseau has dismissed Schklair's comments, saying, "Well, this is so laughable that...you know what? I don't know, probably only in America it can happen, this kind of stuff"; he similarly implied that Schklair's abandoning of the film during production was justification for not receiving such a credit.

== Analysis ==
=== Interpretations, themes, and influences ===
Tommy's life study of human interaction had been put into a Final Draft blender and sprinkled with the darkness of whatever he'd been living through over the last nine months. The one thing Tommy's script wasn't about, despite its characters' claims? Love.

I had a sobering, sad, and powerful realization: our friendship was the most human experience Tommy had had in the last few years. Maybe ever. The happy news was that whatever Tommy had been running from, he'd managed to turn and face it down in his script. Instead of killing himself, he wrote himself out of danger. He did this by making his character [Johnny] the one spotless human being amid chaos, lies and infidelity.

— Sestero on his initial reaction to The Room's script

The Room is considered to be semi-autobiographical as it draws on specific incidents from Wiseau's own life, such as the details of how Johnny came to San Francisco and met Lisa, and the nature of Johnny and Mark's friendship. According to Sestero, the character of Lisa is based on a former lover of Wiseau's to whom he intended to propose marriage with a US$1,500 diamond engagement ring, but because she "betray[ed] him multiple times", their relationship ended in a break-up. Defining the script as "an advisory warning about the perils of having friends", Sestero has described The Room as Wiseau's "life study of human interaction", dealing with additional themes of trust, fear and truth.

Sestero further postulates that Wiseau based Lisa's explicit conniving on the character Tom Ripley, after Wiseau had a profound emotional reaction to the film The Talented Mr. Ripley, and matches elements of its three main characters to those in The Room; Sestero has likewise indicated that the character Mark was named for the Ripley actor Matt Damon, whose first name Wiseau had misheard. Wiseau also drew on the chamber plays of Tennessee Williams, whose highly emotional scenes he enjoyed acting out in drama school – many advertising materials for The Room make explicit parallels to the playwright's work through the tagline "A film with the passion of Tennesee [sic] Williams."

In his direction and performance, Wiseau attempted to emulate Orson Welles, Clint Eastwood, Marlon Brando and James Dean, especially Dean's performance in the film Giant, and went so far as to directly use quotes from their films – the famous line "You are tearing me apart, Lisa!" is derived from a similar line performed by Dean in Rebel Without a Cause.

MacDowell and Zborowski point out that The Room democratizes "the pleasures involved in being a critic," due to the film's blatant breaking of the most simple rules of coherent cinematic narrative. Middlemost has shown that Wiseau's authorship and intentionality are integral to the audience's enjoyment of the film's flaws. Tirosh has suggested that this need for integrity is comparable to the reception of medieval works such as the Icelandic sagas, and equates the audience shouting at the screen with scholarly works on textual editions.

=== Inconsistencies and narrative flaws ===
The script is characterized by numerous mood and personality shifts in characters. In analyzing the film's abrupt tone shifts, Sestero highlighted two scenes in particular. In the first scene, Johnny enters the rooftop in the middle of a tirade about being wrongfully accused of domestic abuse, only to become abruptly cheerful upon seeing Mark; a few moments later, he laughs inappropriately upon learning that a woman who Mark once knew had been severely beaten by a boyfriend. On set, Sestero and script supervisor Sandy Schklair repeatedly tried to convince Wiseau that the line should not be delivered as comical, but Wiseau refused to refrain from laughing. In the second instance, occurring later in the film, Mark attempts to kill Peter by throwing him off a roof after Peter expresses his belief that Mark is having an affair with Lisa; seconds later, Mark pulls Peter back from the edge of the roof, apologizes, and the two continue their previous conversation with no acknowledgment of what just occurred.

In addition to its continuity errors, critics and audiences have commented on the presence of several plots and subplots that have been called inconsistent and irrelevant. The Portland Mercury has stated that a number of "plot threads are introduced, then instantly abandoned." In an early scene, halfway through a conversation about planning a birthday party for Johnny, Claudette off-handedly tells Lisa: "I got the results of the test back. I definitely have breast cancer." The issue is casually dismissed and never revisited during the rest of the film. Similarly, the audience never learns the details surrounding Denny's drug-related debt to Chris-R, or what led to their violent confrontation on the roof.

Beyond being Johnny's friend, Mark's background receives no exposition; when he is first introduced, he claims to be "very busy" while sitting in a parked car in the middle of the day, with no explanation ever given as to his occupation or what he was doing. In The Disaster Artist, Sestero states that he created a backstory for the character in which Mark was an undercover vice detective, which Sestero felt united several otherwise disparate aspects of Mark's character, including the secretive nature of various aspects of his behavior – including marijuana use – his mood swings, and his handling of the Chris-R incident. Wiseau dismissed adding any reference to Mark's past to the script. The makers of The Room video game would later introduce a similar idea as part of a subplot involving Mark's unexplained backstory, much to Sestero's amusement.

At one point, the principal male characters congregate in an alley behind Johnny's apartment to play catch with a football while wearing tuxedos. When Mark arrives, he is revealed to have shaved his beard, and the camera slowly zooms in on his face while dramatic music plays on the soundtrack. Nothing that is said or occurs during the scene has any effect on the plot; the scene ends abruptly when the men decide to return to Johnny's apartment after Peter trips. Similar to most of the other plot points of the film, the event is introduced abruptly and is never referenced elsewhere in the story. Wiseau received enough questions about the scene that he decided to address it in a Q&A segment featured on the DVD release; rather than explaining the scene, though, Wiseau states only that playing football without the proper protective equipment is fun and challenging. Sestero has been questioned about the significance of Mark's shaving, though his only response for several years was "if people only knew." He describes in The Disaster Artist that Wiseau insisted he shave his beard on-set just so that Wiseau would have an excuse for Johnny to call Mark "Babyface," Wiseau's own nickname for Sestero, and that the revealing of beardless Mark would be "a moment." Sestero further detailed how the football-in-tuxedos scene was concocted on set by Wiseau, who never explained the significance of the scene to the cast or crew and insisted that the sequence be filmed at the expense of other, relevant scenes. According to Sestero, during post-production, picture editor and head sound editor Eric Chase also repeatedly tried to convince Wiseau that the film, as he saw it, was terribly paced, and various scenes needed to be shortened or cut entirely in order to give the narrative any coherence, but Wiseau refused to cut any material; ultimately, the only material that was cut consisted of a portion of Johnny and Lisa's first sex scene, alternate takes of Denny's confrontation with Chris-R and Johnny's death, as well as all of the HD camera footage.

== Release ==
=== Promotion ===
According to Sestero, Wiseau submitted the film to Paramount Pictures, hoping to secure them as a distributor. Usually, it takes about two weeks to receive a reply; The Room was rejected within 24 hours. Because of this, the film was promoted almost exclusively through a single billboard in Hollywood, located on Highland Avenue just north of Fountain Avenue, featuring an image Wiseau refers to as "Evil Man": an extreme close-up of his own face with one eye in mid-blink. Although more conventional artwork was created for the film, featuring the main characters' faces emblazoned over the Golden Gate Bridge, Wiseau chose the "Evil Man" for what he regarded as its provocative quality; around the time of the film's release, the image led many passers-by to believe that the movie was a horror film. Wiseau also paid for a small television and print campaign in and around Los Angeles, and hired publicist Edward Lozzi in his efforts to promote and self-distribute the film after it was turned down by Paramount.

Despite the film's failure to enjoy immediate success, Wiseau paid to keep the billboard up for over five years, at the cost of US$5,000 a month. Its bizarre imagery and longevity led to it becoming a minor tourist attraction. When asked how he managed to afford to keep the billboard up for so long in such a prominent location, Wiseau responded: "Well, we like the location, and we like the billboard. So, we feel that people should see The Room. [...] we are selling DVDs, which are selling okay."

=== Film premiere and release ===
The Room premiered on June 27, 2003, at the Laemmle Fairfax and Fallbrook theaters in Los Angeles. Wiseau additionally arranged a screening for the cast and the press at one of the venues, renting a searchlight to sit in front of the theater, and arriving in a limousine. Ticket buyers were given a free copy of the film's soundtrack on CD. Actress Robyn Paris described the audience laughing at the film, and Variety reporter Scott Foundas, who was also in attendance, would later write that the film prompted "most of its viewers to ask for their money back—before even 30 minutes [had] passed." IFC.com described Wiseau's speaking voice in the film as "Borat trying to do an impression of Christopher Walken playing a mental patient." The Guardian described the film as a mix of "Tennessee Williams, Ed Wood, and R. Kelly's Trapped in the Closet."

=== Critical reception ===
The Room has been called one of the worst films ever made. On the review aggregator website Rotten Tomatoes, 24% of 33 critics' reviews are positive, with an average rating of 3.5/10. The website's consensus reads: "A bona fide classic of midnight cinema, Tommy Wiseau's misguided masterpiece subverts the rules of filmmaking with a boundless enthusiasm that renders such mundanities as acting, screenwriting, and cinematography utterly irrelevant. You will never see a football the same way again." Metacritic, which uses a weighted average, assigned the film a score of 9 out of 100, based on 5 critics, indicating "overwhelming dislike". Despite disdain from critics, the film has retrospectively received ironic acclaim from audiences for its perceived shortcomings, with some viewers calling it the "best worst movie ever."

In 2013, The Atlantic's Adam Rosen wrote an article titled "Should Gloriously Terrible Movies Like The Room Be Considered 'Outsider Art'?" where he made the argument "The label [of outsider art] has traditionally applied to painters and sculptors... but it's hard to see why it couldn't also refer to Wiseau or any other thwarted, un-self-aware filmmaker."

In a 2017 interview for a Vox video, The Disaster Artist co-writer Tom Bissell explained his views on The Room's popularity, as well as his personal enjoyment of the film, by noting that:

It is like a movie made by an alien who has never seen a movie, but has had movies thoroughly explained to him. There's not often that a work of film has every creative decision that's made in it on a moment-by-moment basis seemingly be the wrong one. [...] The Room, to me, shatters the distinction between good and bad. Do I think it's a good movie? No. Do I think it's a strong movie that moves me on the level that art usually moves me? Absolutely not. But I can't say it's bad because it's so watchable. It's so fun. It's brought me so much joy. How can something that's bad do those things for me?

=== Midnight circuit ===
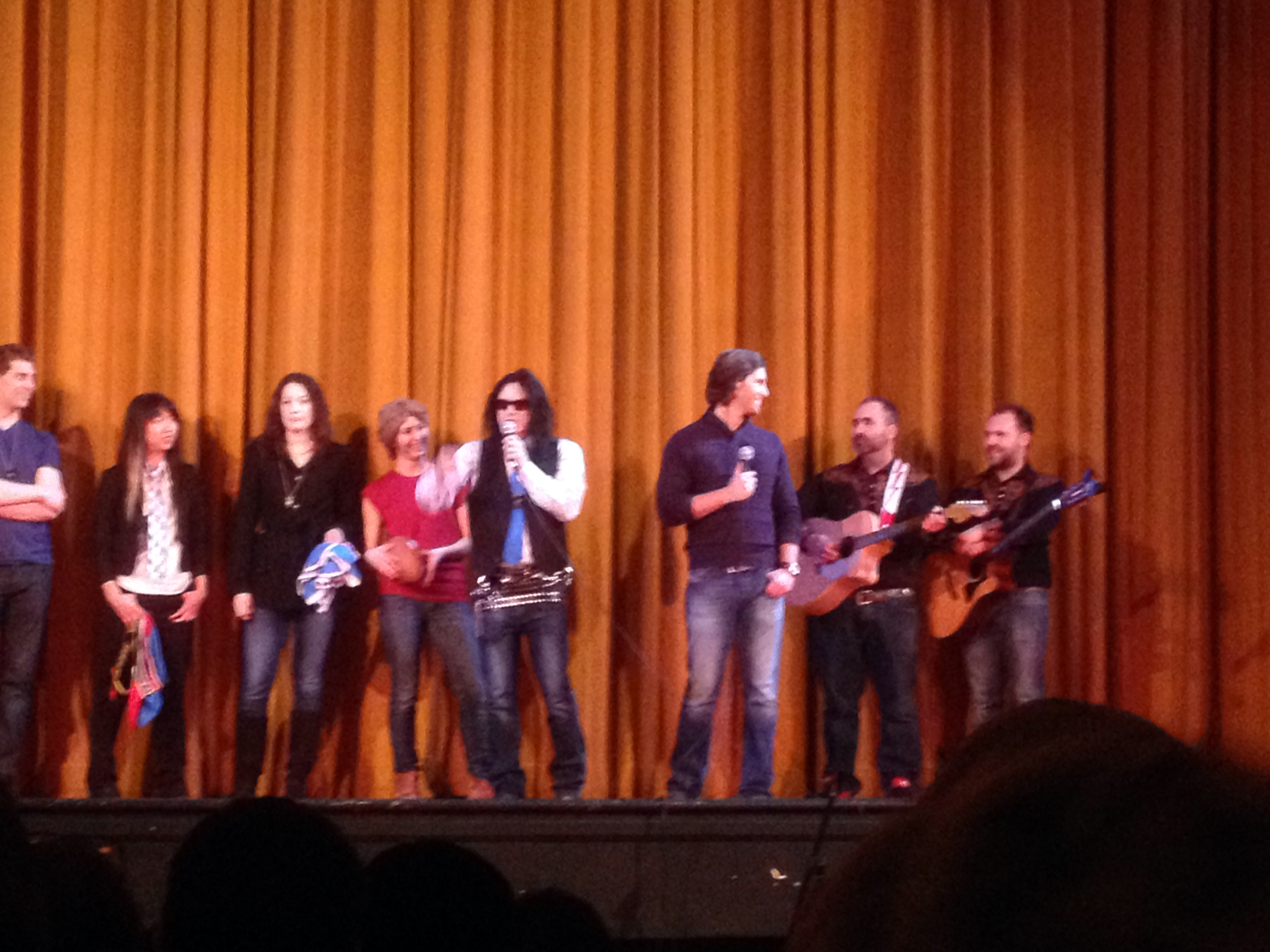
Wiseau and Sestero taking questions from audience members before a showing of The Room

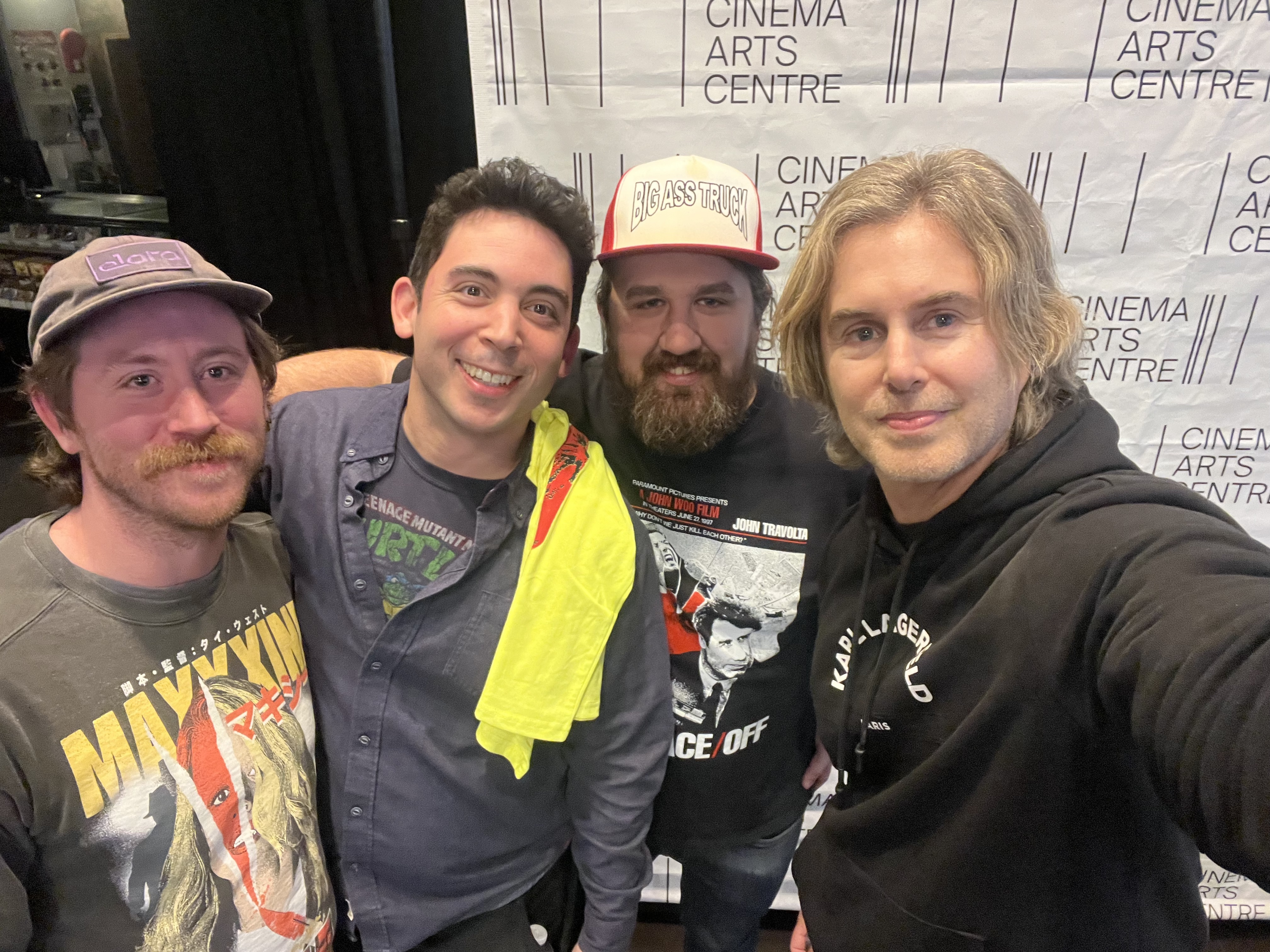
Sestero poses with fans during a screening of The Room in 2025

The Room played in the Laemmle Fairfax and Fallbrook for the next two weeks, grossing a total of US$1,900 (equivalent to $3,325 in 2025) before it was pulled from circulation. Toward the end of its run, the Laemmle Fallbrook theatre displayed two signs on the inside of the ticket window in relation to the film: one that read "NO REFUNDS" and another citing a blurb from an early review: "This film is like getting stabbed in the head." During one showing in the second week of its run, one of the few audience members in attendance was 5-Second Films' Michael Rousselet, who found unintentional humor in the film's poor dialogue and production values. After treating the screening as his "own private Mystery Science Theater", Rousselet began encouraging friends to join him for future showings to mock the film, starting a word-of-mouth campaign that resulted in about 100 attending the film's final screening. Rousselet and his friends saw the film "four times in three days," and it was in these initial screenings that many of The Room traditions were born, such as the throwing of spoons and footballs during the film.

After the film was pulled from theaters, those who had attended the final showing began emailing Wiseau telling him how much they had enjoyed the film. Encouraged by the volume of messages he received, Wiseau booked a single midnight screening of The Room in June 2004, which proved successful enough that Wiseau booked a second showing in July, and a third in August. These screenings proved to be even more successful and were followed by monthly screenings on the last Saturday of the month, which began selling out and continued up until the theatre was sold in 2012. Wiseau frequently made appearances at these screenings, and often engaged with fans afterwards. On the fifth anniversary of the film's premiere, it sold out every screen at the Sunset 5 and both Tommy Wiseau and Greg Sestero did Q&As afterward. The film was featured on the 2008 Range Life tour, and expanded to midnight screenings in several other cities soon after. Celebrity fans of the film included Paul Rudd, David Cross, Will Arnett, Patton Oswalt, Tim Heidecker, Eric Wareheim, Seth Rogen, and James and Dave Franco. Kristen Bell acquired a film reel and hosted private viewing parties; Veronica Mars creator Rob Thomas would also slip references into episodes "as much as possible." The film eventually developed national and international cult status, with Wiseau arranging screenings around the United States, Canada, Scandinavia, the United Kingdom, Australia, and New Zealand. In 2015 Wiseau had expressed interest in an Asian release of The Room, and in January 2018 the film was officially released in Hong Kong, after a group of fans acquired the distribution rights. The Room was officially released in Taiwan in April 2018, during the 2018 Golden Horse Fantastic Film Festival.

By April 2016, the film had been playing at the Mayfair Theatre in Ottawa, Canada for 80 consecutive months. The film had regular showings in many theaters worldwide, with many as a monthly event. Fans interact with the film in a similar fashion to The Rocky Horror Picture Show; audience members dress up as their favorite characters, throw plastic spoons (in reference to an unexplained framed photo of a spoon on a table in Johnny's living room), toss footballs to each other from short distances, and yell insulting comments about the quality of the film as well as lines from the film itself. Wiseau has claimed that it was his intent for audiences to find humor in the film, although viewers and some of the cast members generally have viewed it as a poorly made drama.

=== Home media ===
The Room was released on DVD on November 4, 2003, and Blu-ray in December 2012. The DVD's special features include an interview with Wiseau, who is asked questions by an off-screen Greg Sestero. Wiseau sits directly in front of a fireplace, with a mantle cluttered by various props from the film; next to him sits a large framed theatrical poster for the film. A few of Wiseau's answers are dubbed in, although it is evident that the dubbed responses match what he was originally saying. Wiseau fails to answer several of the questions, instead offering non sequiturs.

Among the outtakes included on the Blu-ray is an alternate version of the Chris-R scene, set in a back alley; instead of tossing a football, Denny is playing basketball and attempts to get the drug dealer to "shoot some H-O-R-S-E" with him to distract him from the debt. Another bonus feature on the Blu-ray is a more than half-hour long fly-on-the-wall style documentary about the making of The Room. The documentary includes no narration, very little dialogue, and only one interview (with cast member Carolyn Minnott), and consists largely of clips of the crew preparing to shoot.

Wiseau first announced plans in April 2011 for a 3D version of The Room, scanned from the 35mm negative. Later, in 2018, he revealed his intentions to reshoot the film in 3D, citing cost-effectiveness reasons. The Room was uploaded to YouTube by Wiseau on September 21, 2018, but was removed the day afterwards. The film made its streaming debut on September 4, 2026 on Tubi, alongside Big Shark.

=== 20th anniversary re-release ===
Fathom Events theatrically re-released The Room for its 20th anniversary on June 27, 2023. Nationwide screenings were preceded by an exclusive special introduction by Wiseau, reflecting on the film's legacy.

== In popular culture ==
In June 2011, it was announced that Greg Sestero had signed a deal with Simon & Schuster to write a book alongside Tom Bissell based on his experiences making the film. The book, titled The Disaster Artist, was published in October 2013. The book was made into an audiobook with Sestero's reading in May 2014 and, in November 2014, won for Best Non-Fiction at the National Arts & Entertainment Journalism Awards.

A film adaptation of The Disaster Artist was announced in February 2014, produced by Seth Rogen and directed by James Franco. Franco described The Disaster Artist as "a combination of Boogie Nights and The Master." The film stars Franco as Wiseau and his brother Dave Franco as Sestero, with the script written by The Fault in Our Stars screenwriters Scott Neustadter and Michael H. Weber. On October 15, 2015, it was announced Rogen would co-star (playing Sandy Schklair), and cinematographer Brandon Trost served as the DP. On October 29, 2015, it was announced that Warner Bros. and New Line Cinema would distribute The Disaster Artist. Filming began December 7, 2015. A work-in-progress version was screened at South by Southwest in March 2017, with the wide release beginning on December 8, 2017. The movie opened with "impressive" box office returns and was nominated for the 2018 Academy Award for Best Adapted Screenplay.

== Other media ==
=== Books ===
Besides The Disaster Artist, a second memoir, Yes, I Directed The Room: The Truth About Directing the "Citizen Kane of Bad Movies", written by Schklair, was published on December 4, 2017, in which he asserts his desire to receive credit for directing the film.

=== Films ===
A Canadian documentary about the film, titled Room Full of Spoons and directed by Rick Harper, was initially given a brief theatrical release in April 2016. The film was pulled from theaters, and plans for a wide release in conjunction with the release of The Disaster Artist were hampered when it became the subject of legal proceedings by Wiseau, who claimed copyright infringement and invasion of privacy. Ultimately, Wiseau's lawsuit was dismissed in 2020 by Ontario Superior Court of Justice judge Paul Schabas, who ordered Wiseau to pay the filmmakers nearly CA$1,000,000 in countersuit damages and lost revenue.

==== Remake ====
On March 9, 2023, /Film reported that The Room Returns!, a greenscreen-based remake of The Room was in post-production, with Bob Odenkirk starring as Johnny, Bella Heathcote as Lisa, and Brando Crawford as director, producer, and co-star, through his company Acting for a Cause. The rest of the cast was announced with Kate Siegel as Lisa's mother Claudette, Mike Flanagan as Peter, and Greg Sestero as Chris-R, the only cast member returning from the original film. Other members of the cast include Arturo Castro, Dilone, Rivkah Reyes, Jarad Schwartz, Mary Neely, and Cameron Kasky. Odenkirk said the film was not made as a joke nor mocking The Room, but was presenting the material of the original film seriously. The profits of the film will be donated to amfAR, an organization for HIV/AIDS research.

The film was initially intended to receive a digital release in 2023, which did not come to fruition. In a 2024 interview Sestero commented that work was still being done on the remake. In July 2025, the Hayden Orpheum Picture Palace in Sydney, Australia announced that they would screen a preview copy of The Room Returns! on 1 August, as part of a double feature with the original film. In an August 2025 interview with Screen Rant, Odenkirk revealed that Wiseau is blocking the release of the remake, due to concerns of the film potentially poking fun at The Room. In October 2025, the film had a screening in the Alamo Drafthouse Chicago theater, followed by screenings in New York City and Los Angeles in November. In June 2026, the official premiere screening occurred in Los Angeles.

=== Video game ===
In September 2010, Newgrounds owner Tom Fulp released a Flash game tribute, in the form of a 16-bit styled adventure game played entirely from Johnny's point of view. The game's artwork was provided by staff member Jeff "JohnnyUtah" Bandelin, with music transcribed by animator Chris O'Neill from the Mladen Milicevic score and soundtrack.

=== Live performances ===
On June 10, 2010, the AFI Silver Theatre and Cultural Center presented a live play/reading based on the film's original script. Wiseau and Sestero reprised their roles of Johnny and Mark, respectively.

In 2011, Wiseau mentioned plans for a Broadway adaptation of the film, in which he would appear only on opening night: "It will be similar to what you see in the movie, except it will be musical. As well as you will see... like, for example, Johnny, we could have maybe 10 Johnnys at the same time singing or playing football. So, the decision have to be made at the time when we actually doing choreography, 'cause I'll be doing choreography, as well I'll be in it only one time, that's it, as Johnny." He mentioned the plans again during a 2016 interview, describing his idea for it to be a "musical/comedy."

=== Web series ===
On October 21, 2014, cast member Robyn Paris launched a Kickstarter campaign to raise the budget for The Room Actors: Where Are They Now? A Mockumentary, her comedy mockumentary web series. On completion, the campaign had raised US$31,556 (equivalent to $42,916 in 2025) from 385 backers. Although a number of the original cast appeared in the series, Wiseau, Sestero and Holmes are not involved. The series premiered at the 24th Raindance Film Festival on September 30, 2016, and debuted on the website Funny or Die on November 30, 2017.

=== Musicals ===
A satirical fan-made musical called OH HAI!: The Rise of Chris-R, written by Tony Orozco and Peter Von Sholly, was released on SoundCloud on July 27, 2017. The work builds on the backstory of the film, particularly the character of Denny and his relationship with Chris-R.

In 2018, Oh Hi, Johnny! The 'Room'sical Parody Musical premiered at the Orlando Fringe Festival. Written by Bryan Jager and Alex Syiek, the show subsequently ran at the Chicago Musical Theatre Festival in February 2019. The work explores what if Tommy Wiseau actually made a stage adaptation of The Room.

== Legacy ==
The comedy show Tim and Eric Awesome Show, Great Job! on Adult Swim featured Wiseau prominently in the fourth season episode titled Tommy. Recruited as a "guest director", Wiseau is interviewed in mockumentary style, along with the show's leading actors, during the production of a fake film titled The Pig Man. Two scenes from The Room are featured during the episode. Adult Swim broadcast the movie three times from 2009 to 2011 as part of their April Fools' Day programming. It would reach such a level of popularity for this move that by 2012 the airing of the film was invoked to be part of their April Fools' prank; they showed the first twenty seconds of the movie before switching to a broadcast of the then-defunct programming block Toonami for the remainder of the night (with block host T.O.M even initially greeting the fooled audience by declaring "Oh, hai, Adult Swim") – the popularity of this prank led Adult Swim to bring the block back on May 26 of that year.

On his 2009 DVD My Weakness Is Strong, comedian Patton Oswalt parodied The Room with a fake infomercial. The spoof also features a cameo from Jon Hamm.

In 2015, Sestero starred in the 5-Second Films feature Dude Bro Party Massacre III, directed by Michael Rousselet, the patient zero of The Room cult movement.

The Sunday, July 5, 2015, installment of Amy Dickinson's advice column Ask Amy unwittingly featured a hoax letter that derived its situational premise from The Room and, even after being edited for publication, retained phrases from the film's dialogue; Dickinson addressed the hoax in the following Saturday's edition of July 11 of the National Public Radio comedy and quiz show Wait Wait... Don't Tell Me!, where she appears as a regular panelist, and in her July 20, 2015 column.

== See also ==
- List of cult films
- List of films considered the worst

== Works cited ==
- Barr, Johanna; Victor, Daniel (December 8, 2017). "You Have Questions About 'The Room' Tommy Wiseau Has Answers, Kind Of..." The New York Times. Archived from the original on August 14, 2023.
- Sestero, Greg; Bissell, Tom (October 2013). The Disaster Artist: My Life Inside The Room, the Greatest Bad Movie Ever Made (First Hardcover ed.). New York: Simon & Schuster. ISBN 9781451661194.
- James MacDowell and James Zborowski, "The Aesthetics of 'So Bad It's Good': Value, Intention, and The Room"*, Intensities: The Journal of Cult Media, 6 (Autumn/Winter 2013), pp. 1–30.
- Richard McCulloch, "'Most People Bring Their Own Spoons': The Room's Participatory Audiences as Comedy Mediators" Archived October 9, 2022, at Ghost Archive, Participations: Journal of Audience & Reception Studies, 8.2 (November 2011), pp. 189–218.
