= Amy Blue =

British alternative rock band

- Origin: London, United Kingdom
- Genres: Alternative rock Electronica
- Instruments: Guitar, Bass, Drums, Laptop
- Years active: 2003–present
- Members: Simon Chatterton; JP Rutter; Lex Sampson; Tom Parr
- Website: Official website

Amy Blue is a British alternative rock band composed of Simon Chatterton (guitar), JP Rutter (guitar), Lex Sampson (drums) and Tom Parr (bass). The group's name was inspired by Rose McGowan's character in the 1995 Gregg Araki movie The Doom Generation.

== History ==
Amy Blue was formed in February 2003 by Simon Chatterton and JP Rutter. Chatterton was previously known for performing solo at university in Northampton under nom de plume evol-i, and was a roadie for hardcore band Jnr Loaded. The band combined industrial noise and quiet atmospherics with traditional songwriting, crafted for two years in a boiler room in Soho, London. Their sound eventually shifted towards a "wall of noise" style reminiscent of early 1990s shoegaze and grunge with glitch and IDM influences, much to the horror of the audiences at their earliest shows in 2004.

December 2005 saw the release of their eponymous EP, which consisted of My Bloody Valentine-esque shoegaze noise crossed with electronic industrial punk pop. The sleeve manipulated a Francis Bacon painting to emphasise the record's gothic feel without being labeled as such.

In December 2006, the band leaked tracks from the EP as being unreleased demos by The Smashing Pumpkins, long before any of the other band's new material from their comeback album Zeitgeist. Spin writer Billy Goodman interviewed Chatterton (referred in the final article as Simon Chatterman) to find out the origins of the songs and the hoax, which Chatterton admitted was to "piss off a few file-sharers".

Bassist Danny Legg joined in June 2006, followed by drummer Lex Sampson in February 2007. The band recorded their debut album, The Fortress & The Fatalist in winter 2007 that was released on iTunes and Spotify in June 2009 that drew favourable reviews. Following a string of loud and energetic shows Danny Legg left the band amicably in 2008, the band then recruited Trevor Hatton, formerly of Lunar Jet Man.

2011 saw the release of compilation The Tinder Tape prior to the April release of the four track EP On the Pleasure of Hating which again was reviewed positively for its more direct and dark sound. Amy Blue began a residency at the Brixton Windmill's Retrofests paying homage to alternative bands Pavement, Guided by Voices and The Smashing Pumpkins.

Focusing on recording for much of 2010–12, the band completed A Hero of Our Time, a ten track album that differed sonically from their previous two releases, and remains largely unreviewed. Thematically, the record was based on Mikhail Lermontov's Russian literary classic of the same name. It was the last of Hatton's recordings with the band, and he left acrimoniously in 2012 to join a covers band.

In April 2016, after a hiatus, the band announced the upcoming release of a double LP called The Unwinding. As of June 2020, it remains unreleased.

== Discography ==
- Enjoy! (2004)
- Eponymous (2005)
- Red Headed Stepchild Records Sampler (2007) (UK indie-label compilation features "Won't You Follow Me" and "The Language of Ghosts")
- The Fortress & The Fatalist (2009)
- Pavement Ist Rad Compilation (2009) (UK indie-label compilation features Amy Blue's cover of Pavement's song "Fight This Generation")
- The Tinder Tape (2011)
- On the Pleasure of Hating (2011)
- A Hero of Our Time (2013)
