= James Duval =

American actor (born 1972)

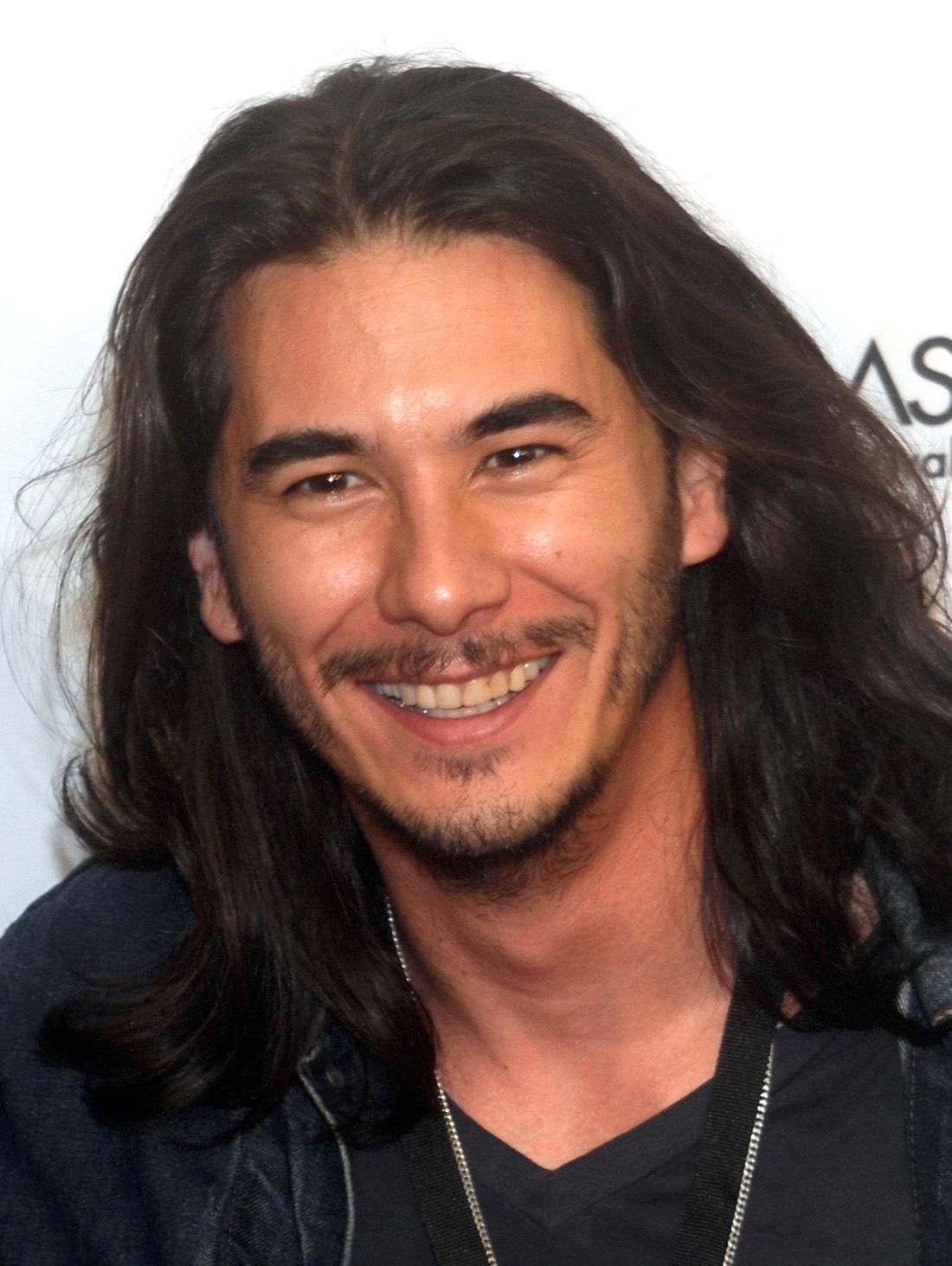
- Duval in 2011
- Born: James Edward Duval; September 10, 1972 (age 54); Detroit, Michigan, U.S.
- Occupation: Actor
- Years active: 1993–present

James Edward Duval (born September 10, 1972) is an American actor. He is known for his roles in Independence Day (1996), Donnie Darko (2001), and the films of Gregg Araki.

== Early life ==
Born in Detroit in 1972 to a Franco-Vietnamese mother from Saigon and a father with Irish and Native American ancestry, Duval's family moved to Los Angeles when he was 2 years old. He grew up around the Greater Los Angeles area, going to elementary school in Redondo Beach before graduating from Gladstone High School in Covina in 1989. He got his start in entertainment as a musician and was classically trained as a pianist, and eventually became more involved in theater up until high school.

== Career ==
Duval moved to Hollywood to pursue acting, getting his start by doing work as an extra - including support in the 1990 John Waters film, Cry Baby. He was approached and scouted for audition by Gregg Araki, who was then in the process of writing Totally Fucked Up, because they were both regulars at the Double Rainbow Cafe in Hollywood.

Primarily an indie actor at first, Duval was able to break into the commercial film industry with Independence Day in 1996. He was simultaneously working on both Nowhere and Independence Day at the same time.

Duval has starred in numerous independent films, including the 2009 psychological thriller The Black Waters of Echo's Pond and the mystery crime-thriller film Noirland.

== Personal life ==
During his early career, while he was acting in Gregg Araki's Teenage Apocalypse films, he identified with their themes of nihilism, social alienation and not fitting in. He said, "I was 18 and living that, searching for myself who I was, where I belonged. I was really confused. Working with Gregg gave me something to move towards. ... there were things I was feeling—that I wasn’t liked, that there were things I couldn’t do to fit in. I was attracted to alternative music and feeling what they were singing about, even though I hadn’t really lived. I was so distraught. I was only 18–19. Everything weighed on that on a daily basis. It was so intense, and almost overwhelming."

In a 1997 interview promoting Araki's Nowhere, Duval discussed the racism he experienced in his youth and his frustration with being asked about his sexuality as a result of playing queer roles. He also mentioned that he was dating his Nowhere co-star Sarah Lassez. Duval has also discussed the challenges in avoiding getting too "pigeonholed" or set in specific characterizations. Wanting to work outside his comfort zone, he cited turning down horror castings in the 90s so that he could continue to expand himself as an actor and artist.

== Filmography ==
Year	Title	Role	Notes
1993	An Ambush of Ghosts	Student #1	
1993	Totally F***ed Up	Andy	
1995	The Doom Generation	Jordan White	
1996	Independence Day	Miguel Casse	
1997	River Made to Drown In	Jaime	
1997	Nowhere	Dark Smith	
1998	Wild Horses	Jimmy	
1998	Stamp and Deliver		
1998	The Clown at Midnight	George Reese	
1998	Alexandria Hotel	Romero	
1998	How to Make the Cruelest Month	Westy	
1998	SLC Punk!	John the Mod	Credited as Jimmy Duval
1999	Go	Singh	
1999	The Weekend	Robert	
2000	This Is How the World Ends	Blue	TV show
2000	Gone in 60 Seconds	Freb	
2001	Amerikana	Chris	
2001	Donnie Darko	Frank Anderson	
2001	The Doe Boy	Hunter Kirk	Won "Best Actor" at the American Indian Film Festival
2001	The Tag	Viggs	
2001	A Galaxy Far, Far Away	Himself	
2002	Comic Book Villains	Baz	
2002	May	Blank	
2002	Scumrock	Drew	
2003	Pledge of Allegiance	Ray	
2004	Window Theory	Dave Kordelewski	
2004	Frog-g-g!	Freb	
2004	Open House	Joel Rodman	
2005	Venice Underground	Lucious Jackson	
2005	Chasing Ghosts	Dmitri Parramatti	
2005	Standing Still	Stoner Steve	
2006	The Iron Man	Lawyer 2	
2006	Mad Cowgirl	Thierry	
2006	Pancho and Lefty	Lefty	
2007	Kush	Cyrus	
2007	Numb	Caleb	Short film
2007	The Pacific and Eddy	Noel	
2007	Luck of the Draw	Grady	
2008	The Art of Travel	Taylor "One Ball"	
2008	Pox	Himself	
2008	Toxic	Brad	
2008	Cornered!	Jimmy	
2008	Evilution	Asia Mark	
2009	Thirsty	Beverage Announcer	Voice role
2009	2 Dudes & a Dream	Phil	
2009	Penance	Guy	
2009	The Black Waters of Echo's Pond	Rick	
2010	Now Here	Luis Ortiz	
2010	Everything Will Happen Before You Die	Paynie	
2010	Caller ID	Miles	
2010	Closing Time	Jimmy	
2010	Noirland	Tiberius Malloy	
2010	Playback	Clark	
2010	Kaboom	Messiah	
2011	Naked Angel	Andreas	
2011	Alyce Kills	Vince	
2011	Not Another Not Another Movie	Himself	
2012	Delirium	Burell	
2012	Sushi Girl	Francis	
2012	Touchback	Rodriguez	
2013	Look at Me	Frank	
2013	Blue Dream	Robert Harmon	
2014	Hercules Reborn	Horace	
2015	Punk's Dead	John The Mod	
2015	The Sparrows	Hector Sanchez	
2015	Tales of Halloween	Dante	
2016	American Romance	Stewart Miles	
2017	The Abduction of Jennifer Grayson	Jeremy	
2017	Spreading Darkness	Mark Minscourri	
2018	BoJack Horseman	Studio Grip	Episode: "The Dog Days Are Over"
2019	Now Apocalypse	Homeless man	Recurring
2022	Without Ward	Helmholtz W. Gault	
2022	I, Challenger	Sid	
2024	Aftermath	Martin	
2026	Numbskull Revolution	Futurecide	
2026	I Want Your Sex	Justice of the Peace	
