= The Decline of Fucking Western Civilization =

- Directed by: Gregg Araki
- Written by: Gregg Araki; Kevin W. Koehler
- Produced by: Gregg Araki
- Starring: Ashton Kutcher; Alison Brie
- Production companies: Why Not Productions; Goodfellas
- Country: France
- Language: English

The Decline of Fucking Western Civilization is an upcoming English-language French black comedy film directed by Gregg Araki and co-written by Kevin W. Koehler. It stars Ashton Kutcher and Alison Brie.

== Cast ==
- Ashton Kutcher
- Alison Brie
- Jesse Williams
- Kal Penn
- Michael Chiklis
- David Koechner
- Nat Faxon
- Wendi McLendon-Covey
- Steve Guttenberg
- Colleen Camp
- Giovanni Ribisi
- Judy Greer
- Margaret Cho
- Alex Borstein
- Lulu Wilson
- Charlie Bushnell

== Production ==
In July 2026, it was revealed that Gregg Araki was working on his next feature film, following I Want Your Sex. The film had been described as "Election meets American Beauty." Principal photography began in September 2026, in Los Angeles, for the newly-titled The Decline of Fucking Western Civilization, with Ashton Kutcher and Alison Brie joining the cast, and Jesse Williams in talks. Production officially wrapped in October.
