= Triumph (2021 film) =

American drama film by Brett Leonard

- Promotional release poster
- Directed by: Brett Leonard
- Written by: Michael D. Coffey
- Produced by: Massimiliano Musina; Michael Clofine; Michael D. Coffey; RJ Mitte; Terrence Howard
- Starring: RJ Mitte; Terrence Howard
- Edited by: Kevin Hickman
- Music by: Gregg Leonard
- Production companies: Digital Ignition Entertainment; The MAP Group; Argonaut Entertainment Partners
- Distributed by: Relativity Media
- Release date: April 30, 2021
- Running time: 100 minutes
- Country: United States
- Language: English

Triumph is a 2021 American coming-of-age drama film directed by Brett Leonard and starring RJ Mitte and Terrence Howard, with Mitte and Howard also serving as executive producers. Based on the life of the film's screenwriter, Michael D. Coffey, it stars Mitte as Mike, a high school student with mild cerebral palsy who is determined to wrestle for his scholastic wrestling team.

== Cast ==
- RJ Mitte as Mike
- Colton Haynes as Jeff
- Johnathon Schaech as Doug
- Grace Victoria Cox as Patty
- Terrence Howard as Coach Cutting
- John Clofine as Young Mike

== Release ==
Triumph received a limited theatrical release in the United States on April 30, 2021.

== Reception ==
On the review aggregator website Rotten Tomatoes, 40% of 5 critics' reviews are positive, with an average rating of 5.5/10.

Phuong Le of The Guardian gave the film a score of two stars out of five and wrote that, "this underdog, coming-of-age sports movie has a big heart but lacks the competency to execute its aspirational premise." The Austin Chronicle's Trace Sauveur also gave the film two stars out of five and wrote, "Though good-natured, by the end it feels indistinguishable from an extended after-school special." Ben Kenigsberg of The New York Times gave the film a negative review, writing that Mitte "sells Mike's tenacity, but the contrivances around him let him down."
