= RJ Mitte =

American actor and activist (1992–2026)

- Mitte in 2015
- Born: Roy Frank Mitte III; August 21, 1992; Jackson, Mississippi, U.S.
- Died: October 12, 2026 (aged 34); Brownsville, Texas, U.S.
- Occupations: Actor; film producer; disability rights activist; model
- Years active: 2006–2026
- Organization: The Mitte Foundation
- Partner: Kennedy Suarez (2018–2026)

Roy Frank "RJ" Mitte III (/ˈmɪti/ MIT-ee; August 21, 1992 – October 12, 2026) was an American actor and disability rights activist. Born in Jackson, Mississippi, Mitte was diagnosed with cerebral palsy when he was three years old. He moved to Los Angeles in 2006 to find acting opportunities where his disability could educate viewers. After playing minor roles in sitcoms, he was cast in his breakthrough role as Walter White Jr. on the AMC neo-Western crime drama television series Breaking Bad (2008–2013).

Mitte starred in the ABC Family teen and family drama television series Switched at Birth (2014) and the Netflix live-action/adult animated mixed media superhero television series The Guardians of Justice (2022). He appeared in Who's Driving Doug (2016), the thriller-drama Time Share (2018), the independent comedy Standing Up for Sunny (2019), the thriller The Oak Room (2020), and the coming-of-age drama Triumph (2021), the lattermost of which he executive produced.

Mitte advocated for the recognition of cerebral palsy and other disabilities. He was a Screen Actors Guild spokesman for actors with disabilities, a celebrity ambassador for United Cerebral Palsy, and the president of the nonprofit organization the Mitte Foundation. He received the SAG-AFTRA Harold Russell Award in 2013.

== Early and personal life ==
Roy Frank Mitte III was born on August 21, 1992, in Jackson, Mississippi. He was delivered by emergency caesarean section and was not breathing at birth, which resulted in permanent brain damage (hypoxic-ischemic encephalopathy). He was adopted a few weeks later by Roy Frank Mitte Jr. and Dyna Mitte, who separated when he was two months old. He was diagnosed with cerebral palsy at the age of three, and doctors put his legs in casts for six months in an attempt to straighten his feet.

He was raised by his mother following his parents' separation, splitting time between Lafayette, Louisiana, and Austin, Texas. After his mother became paralyzed following a car accident, Mitte assumed financial responsibility for his family at the age of 13, which by then also included his sister, Lacianne Carriere, who was born when he was 11 years old. As of 2015, he remained financially responsible for both his mother and sister. Mitte's first language was Spanish, owing to the fact that his mother hired a monolingual babysitter to watch him while she worked.

Mitte was fitted with leg braces and used crutches throughout most of his childhood. His body became stronger over time through sports and exercise, and he no longer needed walking devices by his teenage years. In a 2012 interview, he stated he experienced bullying during his school years, recalling an incident when his hand was broken. In 2006, he relocated to Los Angeles, California, with his family after his younger sister received a job offer in movie production. Mitte was in a relationship with girlfriend Kennedy Suarez from 2018, having been long-term friends beforehand. He announced their engagement in October 2025.

== Career ==
Mitte at the 68th Annual Peabody Awards in 2009

After receiving several roles as an extra, including in the Disney teen sitcom Hannah Montana, Mitte became interested in films and decided to take acting lessons. Shortly after, he was offered the role of Walter White Jr., a character who also has cerebral palsy, in the AMC series Breaking Bad. Series creator Vince Gilligan modeled the character on a friend who had cerebral palsy and used crutches; the character used crutches to walk, though Mitte did not require them in real life by that time. Variety's Daniel D'Addario called Mitte's performance "a breakthrough for disability representation". Mitte felt the role "set really high standards [...] that I can never meet".

At the 2013 Media Access Awards, Mitte received the SAG-AFTRA Harold Russell Award for his portrayal of Walter White Jr. on the series and also presented the eponymous RJ Mitte Diversity Award to deaf actor Ryan Lane. The Screen Actors Guild named Mitte as the spokesman for actors with disabilities and he was the representative of Inclusion in the Arts and Media of Performers with Disabilities, which employs artists with disabilities.

In 2011, Mitte starred in the short horror film Stump. That same year, he worked as executive producer of the documentary Vanished: The Tara Calico Story, about the disappearance of Tara Calico. Around and after Breaking Bad's conclusion in 2013, Mitte appeared in the films House of Last Things (2013), Dixieland (2015), and as the lead character in Who's Driving Doug (2016). He had a guest appearance on Vegas in 2012, and a recurring role in Switched at Birth in 2014. He participated in the second series of Celebrity Island with Bear Grylls in 2017, departing in the second episode due to the camp's disorganization.

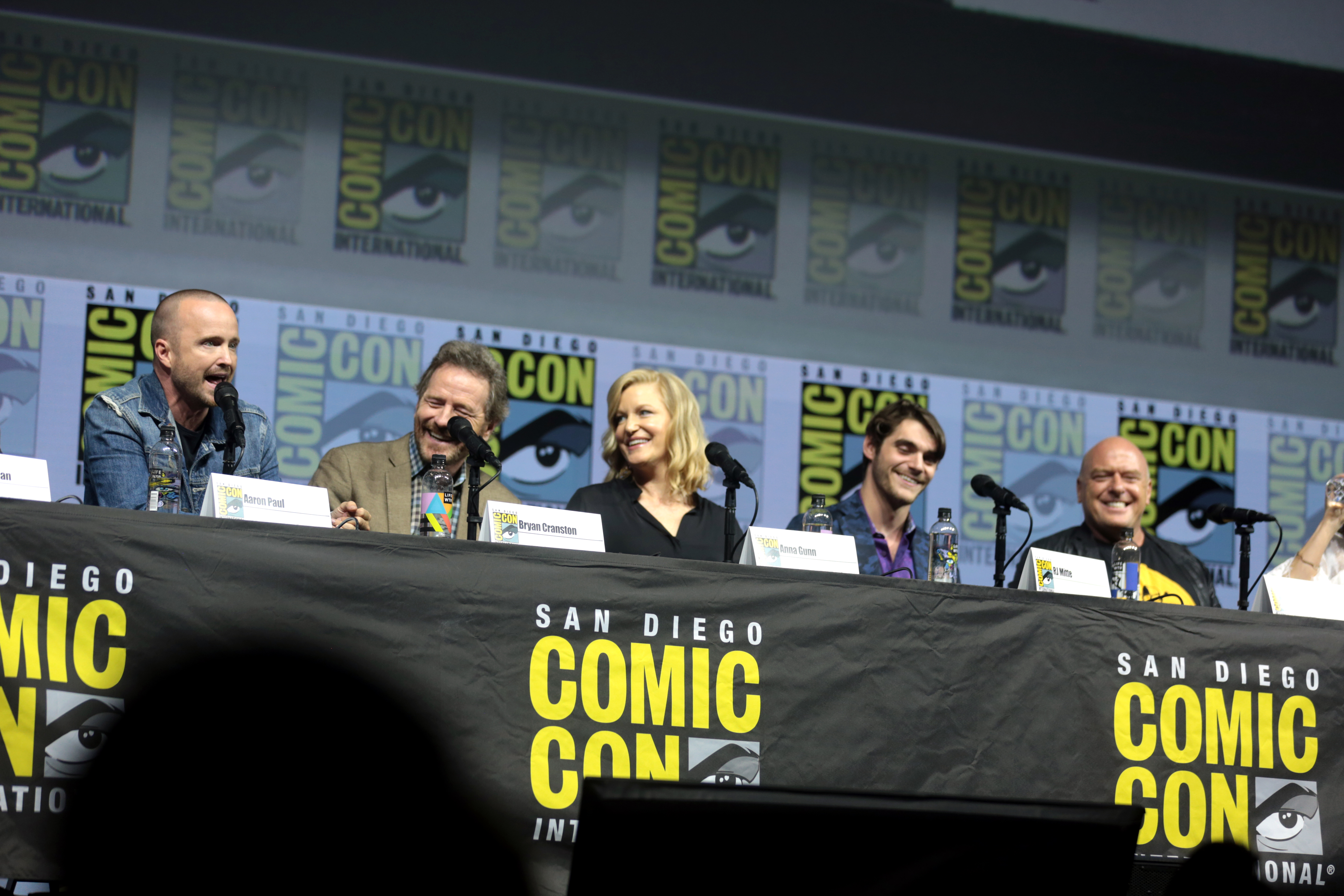
The cast of Breaking Bad at San Diego Comic-Con in 2018. L–R: Aaron Paul, Bryan Cranston, Anna Gunn, Mitte, and Dean Norris.

Mitte modeled for a spring 2014 Gap ad campaign. He appeared on the cover of the February/March 2015 issue of Neurology Now, published by the American Academy of Neurology. The issue included a short biography and his views on cerebral palsy, bullying, and his acting career. In June 2015, he modeled on a fashion show catwalk for Vivienne Westwood. In November 2015, Mitte was announced to be a presenter as part of British Channel 4's coverage of the 2016 Rio Summer Paralympics. In 2016, he appeared in the music video for "If I Get High" by English rock band Nothing But Thieves.

Mitte spent much of his career as a disability rights activist. From 2014, he served as an ambassador for the Shriners Children's, having been treated at a Shriners Hospital in Shreveport, Louisiana, as a child, and he was named a celebrity ambassador for United Cerebral Palsy in 2015. He was the president of the Mitte Foundation, an organization founded by his grandparents, through which he advocated for greater inclusion.

Mitte was cast in several science fiction and thriller films, including The Recall (2017), Time Share (2018), and River Runs Red (2018), and he was the lead in the comedy film Standing Up for Sunny (2019), portraying a man with cerebral palsy. On television, he appeared in an episode of This Close in 2018, in two episodes of Now Apocalypse in 2019, and as a lead role in The Guardians of Justice in 2022. Mitte played the lead characters in The Oak Room (2020), The Unseen (2023), and Triumph (2021), and executive-produced the latter, before his role in Westhampton (2025).

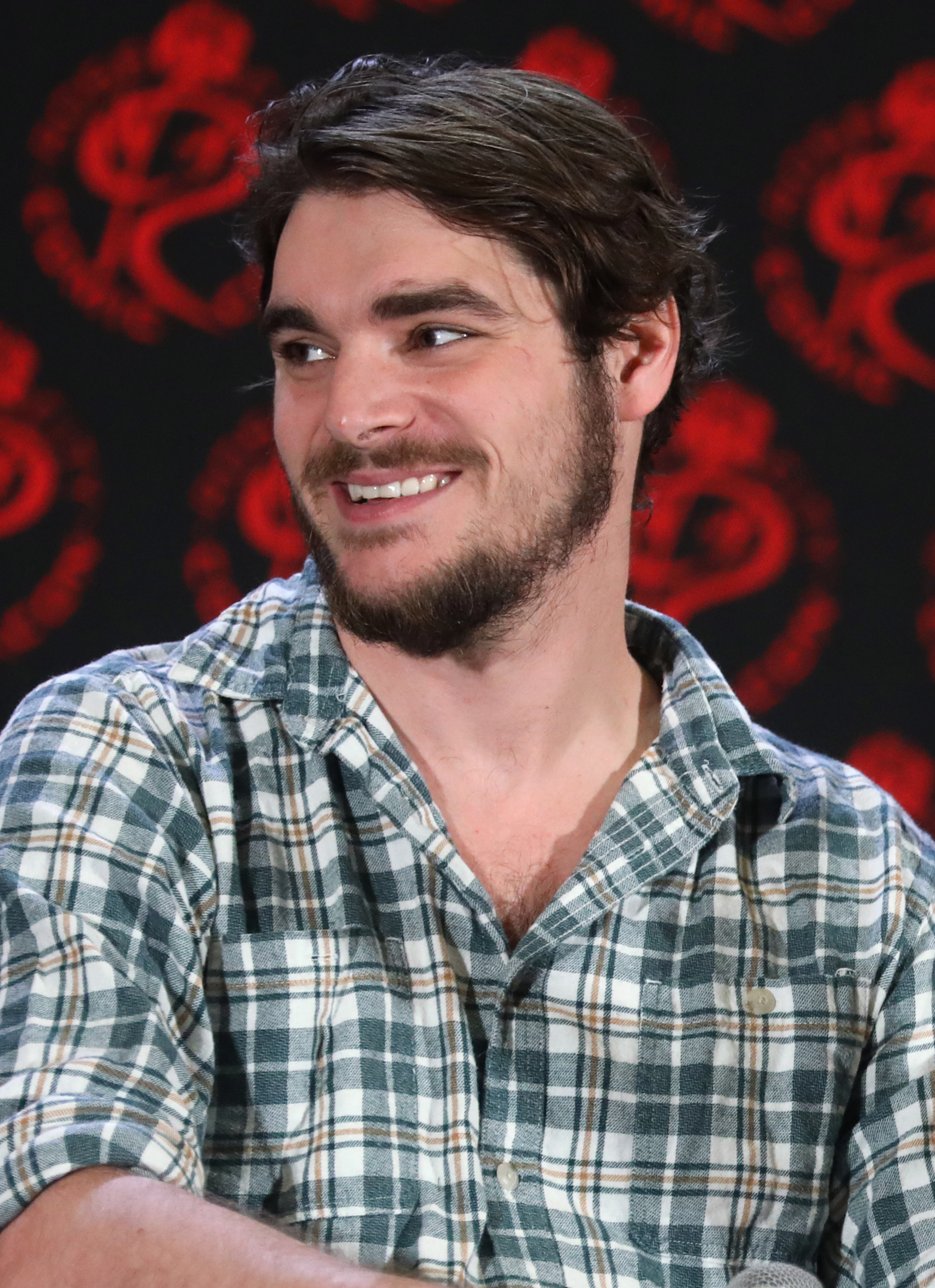
Mitte at Rose City Comic Con in 2024

In a November 2025 interview with the Iced Coffee Hour podcast, Mitte stated he had experienced financial difficulties after hiring a business manager who he alleged stole money intended for tax payments and provided him with falsified tax filings. According to Mitte, the manager also defrauded 14 other actors, primarily elderly individuals and people with disabilities. He said the resulting tax liabilities and interest took ten years to settle, stating: "I've paid more in taxes than I got from Breaking Bad".

He appeared as a lead in Josh Webber's Love Me Dead, which premiered in Germany in 2024; following changes and reshoots, it is scheduled to be released in 2026 or 2027 as Cassi. Some of Mitte's final roles included Talking to Strangers and One Eye Open (both 2026), both of which he was promoting days before his death. He had signed on for two more films around this time.

== Death ==
Mitte died at his home in Brownsville, Texas, on October 12, 2026, at the age of 34. After he missed a phone call from his mother at 11 a.m., she went to his home with lunch and found his body upon arriving. Emergency personnel received a call at 12:50 p.m. and arrived at his residence, where local authorities pronounced him dead at 1:32 p.m. His official cause of death was suicide by hanging. According to his mother, he left no suicide note. She had encouraged him to attend therapy for several months, but he assured her that he was "handling it". He made his final public appearance eight days earlier at the 2026 Albuquerque International Balloon Fiesta with Breaking Bad co-star Luis Moncada.

Several industry figures shared tributes, including Breaking Bad creator Vince Gilligan and co-stars Charles Baker, Bryan Cranston, Giancarlo Esposito, Anna Gunn, Matt Jones, Daniel and Luis Moncada, Dean Norris, Bob Odenkirk, Raymond Cruz, Aaron Paul, and Steven Michael Quezada, as well as Switched at Birth co-stars Marlee Matlin and Lea Thompson. Cranston, who portrayed Mitte's on-screen father, praised his determination and wrote that "he never – ever – allowed that challenge [of cerebral palsy] to be an excuse for anything". His funeral was held at the Mitte Arts and Cultural Center in Brownsville on October 16, followed by public celebrations of life in Albuquerque, New Mexico, on October 25, and in Los Angeles, California, on November 7.

== Filmography ==
=== Film ===
Year	Title	Role	Notes	Ref.
2011	Stump	Tim		
2013	House of Last Things	Tim		
2015	Dixieland	CJ		
2016	Who's Driving Doug	Doug		
2017	The Recall	Brendan		
2018	Time Share	Tom		
2019	Standing Up for Sunny	Travis		
2019	Carol of the Bells	Scott Johnson		
2020	The Oak Room	Steve		
2021	Triumph	Mike	Also executive producer	
2023	The Unseen	Tommy Olson	Also producer	
2024	Love Me Dead	Isaac	Also producer	
2025	Westhampton	Fitz		
2026	Talking to Strangers	Joshua		
2026	One Eye Open	Brad Everett	Posthumous release	
TBA	Cassi	Isaac	Completed; posthumous release	
TBA	SNAFU: Situation Normal All F'd Up		Post-production; posthumous release	

=== Television ===
Year	Title	Role	Notes	Ref.
2006	Everybody Hates Chris	Audience member	Episode: "Everybody Hates Elections"	
2007	Hannah Montana	School Jock	Episode: "Schooly Bully"	
2008–2013	Breaking Bad	Walter White Jr.	Main role	
2013	Vegas	Russ Auster	Episode: "Paiutes"	
2014	Switched at Birth	Campbell Bingman	Recurring role (season 3)	
2016	Robot Chicken	Walter White Jr. (voice)	Episode: "Food"	
2017	The Celebrity Island with Bear Grylls	Contestant	Season 2	
2017	Chance	Solomon	Episode: "The Collected Works of William Shakespeare"	
2018	This Close	TJ Black	Episode: "Who We Are"	
2019	Now Apocalypse	Leif	2 episodes	
2022	The Guardians of Justice	Mind Master	Main role	

=== Music videos ===
Year	Title	Artist	Ref.
2013	"Dead Bite"	Hollywood Undead	
2013	"Party Like Tomorrow is the End of the World"	Steel Panther	
2016	"If I Get High"	Nothing but Thieves	
2016	"In the Dark"	3 Doors Down	
2024	"Never Really Know"	Kameron Marlowe	

== Awards and nominations ==
Award	Year	Category	Project	Result	Ref.
Media Access Awards	2013	SAG-AFTRA Harold Russell Award	Breaking Bad	Awarded	
Young Artist Awards	2012	Best Performance in a TV Series – Recurring Young Actor 17–21	Breaking Bad	Nominated	
Screen Actors Guild Awards	2012	Outstanding Performance by an Ensemble in a Drama Series	Breaking Bad	Nominated	
Screen Actors Guild Awards	2013	Outstanding Performance by an Ensemble in a Drama Series	Breaking Bad	Nominated	
Screen Actors Guild Awards	2014	Outstanding Performance by an Ensemble in a Drama Series	Breaking Bad	Won	
