= House of Last Things =

- Theatrical poster
- Directed by: Michael Bartlett
- Written by: Michael Bartlett
- Produced by: Michael Bartlett; Jon Manning
- Starring: Lindsey Haun; Blake Berris; RJ Mitte; Randy Schulman; Diane Dalton; Micah Nelson
- Cinematography: Ken Kelsch
- Edited by: Michael Bartlett; Michael Ward
- Music by: Alessandro Ponti; Andrew Poole Todd
- Production company: Cloudcover Films
- Distributed by: Revolver Entertainment
- Release date: January 31, 2013 (France)
- Running time: 109 minutes
- Country: United States
- Language: English

House of Last Things is a 2013 American dark fantasy thriller film directed and written by Michael Bartlett. It stars Lindsey Haun, Blake Berris, RJ Mitte, Randy Schulman, Diane Dalton, and Micah Nelson. House sitters (Haun, Berris) discover that an unhappily married couple (Schulman, Dalton) may have left them in a haunted house.

== Plot ==
Unhappily married couple Alan and Sarah reunite when she is released from a mental hospital. Alan, a classical music critic, announces that he has bought tickets to Italy for them both and introduces Kelly, whom he has hired to house sit for them. Although reluctant to leave for a foreign country so soon after her release, Sarah eventually agrees. Later flashbacks reveal that Alan and Kelly have been having an affair, and Alan intends to stress Sarah to the breaking point, so that she will again attempt suicide. Meanwhile, Jesse, Kelly's petty criminal boyfriend, pushes her to allow him to stay in the house with her. Kelly refuses, and, upset that she allows her disabled brother Tim to move in, Jesse storms off.

Jesse later steals Alan's car and prepares to sell it to a friend, but he reconsiders his actions when he finds Adam, a child who has been abandoned at a local supermarket. Taking Adam back to the house, Jesse proposes that they ransom him. Shocked by the suggestion, Kelly attempts to return Adam to his parents but can not get any information from the child, who seems comfortable staying with them. Panicking over what to do next, Kelly listens to the radio and television broadcasts, but none of them mention a missing boy. Kelly becomes suspicious that something is wrong, but Jesse dismisses her concerns. Tim sees visions in the house, and his behavior becomes erratic. When one of the visions reveals to Tim that Kelly and Alan plan to run away together, he tells Jesse, who reacts nonchalantly.

In Italy, Alan and Sarah argue over whether they should return to the United States early, and both become stressed from visions and flashbacks, one of which reveals that Adam is their dead child. Drunk and responding to a haunting flashback, Alan becomes defensive about Adam's death. While Sarah is driving their car, Alan says he covered up the fact that he accidentally killed Adam while playing golf in the back yard, and Sarah becomes distraught. As her driving becomes erratic, Alan insists that she pull over, and they become involved in a fatal car accident. Kelly, Jesse, Tim, and Adam hear the accident broadcast over the entertainment center's speakers in the house.

As time goes on, Kelly's and Jesse's personalities shift to become more like Alan and Sarah's. Jesse becomes interested in golf and classic music, dressing well, and starting a family. He urges Tim to stop cursing and get a job, and asks Adam to call him "dad". After an initial period of sickness, Kelly begins baking pies and acting as a mother to Adam. Confused by the changes in Kelly's and Jesse's personalities, Tim becomes alienated and ultimately commits suicide. When Kelly locates a photo book full of pictures of Adam, the two of them bond, and a breeze blows out the candles on a birthday cake for Adam.

== Cast ==
- Lindsey Haun as Kelly
- Blake Berris as Jesse
- RJ Mitte as Tim
- Randy Schulman as Alan
- Diane Dalton as Sarah
- Micah Nelson as Adam
- Michele Mariana as Rose Pepper

== Production ==
The film was shot in Portland, Oregon.

== Release ==
House of Last Things premiered at the Festival international du film fantastique de Gérardmer. It also screened at the 2013 Mórbido Fest. Revolver Entertainment purchased distribution rights in the U.S. and Canada after the 2014 Cannes Film Festival.

== Reception ==
Ben Umstead of Twitch Film wrote, "Though the film is at times still quite creepy, and always persistently strange, Bartlett's story is refreshingly absent of evil and any real terror, gruesome or otherwise. For as much as it is a ghost story House Of Last Things is also a love story." Scott Hallam of Dread Central rated it 3.5/5 stars and wrote, "Instead of being a traditional haunting tale, it's an ambitious take on a ghost story which at times works very well and at others becomes muddy." Mark L. Miller of Ain't It Cool News called it "a twisting turning fever dream of a film full of lush treasures and nightmarish imagery."
