= Now Apocalypse =

American comedy television series

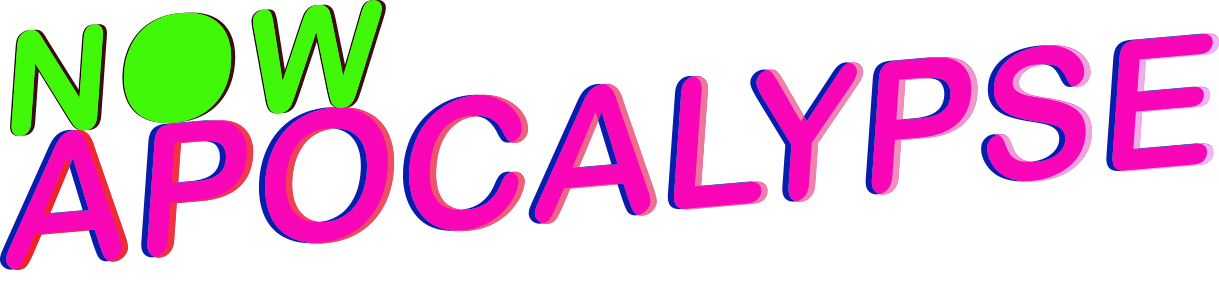
- Genre: Comedy
- Written by: Gregg Araki; Karley Sciortino
- Directed by: Gregg Araki
- Starring: Avan Jogia; Kelli Berglund; Beau Mirchoff; Roxane Mesquida
- Country of origin: United States
- Original language: English
- No. of seasons: 1
- No. of episodes: 10

Production
- Executive producers: Gregg Araki; Steven Soderbergh; Gregory Jacobs
- Camera setup: Single-camera
- Running time: 29–32 minutes

Original release
- Network: Starz
- Release: March 10 – May 12, 2019

Now Apocalypse is an American comedy television series that aired for one season of ten episodes from March 10 to May 12, 2019, on Starz. The series was written by Gregg Araki and Karley Sciortino. Araki also was director and executive producer alongside Steven Soderbergh and Gregory Jacobs. Starz canceled the series after one season on July 26, 2019.

== Premise ==
Ulysses, his friends Carly and Ford, and Ford's girlfriend Severine navigate love, sex, and fame in Los Angeles. Troubled by sinister, premonitory dreams, Ulysses wonders if the end of the world as we know it is coming, or if he is simply suffering from some kind of marijuana-fueled delusions.

== Cast and characters ==
=== Main ===
- Avan Jogia as Ulysses Zane, Carly's best friend
- Kelli Berglund as Carly Carlson, Ulysses' best friend, a struggling actress and cam girl. According to Uly, Carly also has anxiety.
- Beau Mirchoff as Ford Halstead, Ulysses' straight roommate
- Roxane Mesquida as Severine Bordeaux, Ford's girlfriend

=== Recurring ===
- Evan Hart as Lars
- Taylor Hart as Klaus
- Tyler Posey as Gabriel
- Desmond Chiam as Jethro
- Kevin Daniels as Barnabas
- Grace Victoria Cox as Amber
- Mary Lynn Rajskub as Frank
- Chris Aquilino as Kai
- Avra Friedman as Magenta
- Devan Chandler Long as Otto West
- Henry Rollins as Mitchell Kent
- RJ Mitte as Leif
- Jacob Artist as Isaac
- James Duval as Homeless man

== Episodes ==
No.	Title	Directed by	Written by	Original release date	U.S. viewers (millions)
1	"This Is the Beginning of the End"	Gregg Araki	Story by : Gregg Araki; Teleplay by : Gregg Araki and Karley Sciortino	March 10, 2019	0.147
Ulysses finally meets Gabriel, the attractive guy he has been texting. They hook up in an alley, and are both affected by the encounter. Online sex worker Carly is bored with Jethro, the actor she is dating. Aspiring screenwriter Ford is approached by a producer, Barnabas. He wants to be exclusive with astrobiological theorist Severine, but she prefers an open relationship. Ulysses finds himself at the scene of his recurring nightmare, in which a homeless man is being raped by a reptilian alien.
2	"Where Is My Mind?"	Gregg Araki	Story by : Gregg Araki; Teleplay by : Gregg Araki and Karley Sciortino	March 17, 2019	0.124
Trying to make sense of his vision, Ulysses reads about an alleged conspiracy involving reptilian aliens infiltrating Earth society. Barnabas takes Ford to a film premiere, where he meets famed director Otto West. Severine lures Ford into a threesome with Daphne, but Severine prefers to watch. Jethro finds Carly's stash of sex toys, and agrees to let her spank him.
3	"The Rules of Attraction"	Gregg Araki	Story by : Gregg Araki; Teleplay by : Gregg Araki and Karley Sciortino	March 24, 2019	0.091
Ulysses is bewildered by Gabriel's disappearance. Otto convinces Ford to pose for him. Severine's investigation continues. Carly's acting teacher Frank comes on to her. Ford is upset when Severine has sex with her ex, Mustafa. Ulysses gets a middle-of-the-night text from Gabriel, and reluctantly agrees to meet him.
4	"The Downward Spiral"	Gregg Araki	Story by : Gregg Araki; Teleplay by : Gregg Araki and Karley Sciortino	March 31, 2019	0.082
Ulysses has sex with a straight, married delivery guy. Ford takes Ulysses to a men's support group. Severine suspects she is being watched and followed. Carly interviews new roommates. Ford tells Severine that he was upset when she slept with Mustafa, and she suggests that they try only having sex with other people together.
5	"Stranger Than Paradise"	Gregg Araki	Story by : Gregg Araki; Teleplay by : Gregg Araki and Karley Sciortino	April 7, 2019	0.085
Ford takes Severine, Ulysses, and Carly to a lavish celebrity party in Palm Springs. Ulysses has brusque encounter alien conspiracy theorist Mitchell Kent. Severine rushes back to LA for a work emergency. Carly is attracted to Leif, a sculptural artist with cerebral palsy, but resists having sex with him because of Jethro. Ulysses has sex with a waitress from the party. When a despondent Ford passes out, Ulysses catches Barnabas molesting him.
6	"She's Lost Control"	Gregg Araki	Story by : Gregg Araki; Teleplay by : Gregg Araki and Karley Sciortino	April 14, 2019	0.080
Ulysses helps Carly shoot her web series, Sluts. Ford is unhappy that Severine is spending so much time at work. Carly's agent drops her. Ford explodes when Ulysses warns him about Barnabas and Otto.
7	"Anywhere Out of the World"	Gregg Araki	Story by : Gregg Araki; Teleplay by : Gregg Araki and Karley Sciortino	April 21, 2019	0.052
Severine takes Ford to a lavish sex party. Ford is horrified to discover that Otto has used his photos for underwear ads plastered all over LA. Ulysses is smitten with social worker Isaac.
8	"Unknown Pleasures"	Gregg Araki	Story by : Gregg Araki; Teleplay by : Gregg Araki and Karley Sciortino	April 28, 2019	0.093
Carly takes Jethro to a BDSM club. Severine surprises Ford by arranging a threesome with a man he said was attractive, but Ford cannot go through with it. Ulysses and Isaac are very into each other.
9	"Disappear Here"	Gregg Araki	Story by : Gregg Araki; Teleplay by : Gregg Araki and Karley Sciortino	May 5, 2019	0.069
Isaac tells Ulysses about an increasing epidemic among the local homeless population in which they have delusions of being sexually assaulted by aliens. Carly runs into Leif, the guy who tempted her in Palm Springs. As they have frozen yogurt together after their exercises in the park, they begin discussing what counts as cheating on someone since Carly is still with her boyfriend Jethro. But unfortunately during the conversation, the subject matter causes Carly to have an anxiety attack so Leif tries to help her. Once she relaxes, Carly reveals to Leif that the talk of cheating made her feel quite unusually anxious. Ulysses and Isaac officially become boyfriends, and Isaac gives Ulysses a key to his apartment. Ford is upset when Severine is summoned to Roswell, New Mexico indefinitely for work. Jethro discovers Carly's side job as a camgirl when he inadvertently solicits her on the website. As Ford rips up the phone number he received from another woman, Severine has a threesome with her twin coworkers, Lars and Klaus.
10	"Everything Is Gone Forever"	Gregg Araki	Story by : Gregg Araki; Teleplay by : Gregg Araki and Karley Sciortino	May 12, 2019	0.064
Ulysses's relationship with Isaac implodes when Isaac learns about his intense past connection with Gabriel. Carly and Jethro argue about her cam job. Ford is devastated when Severine breaks things off with him, and is unwilling to have sex with another woman, Cleopatra. Carly takes a meeting with a producer who turns out to be one of her cam clients. Ulysses questions the homeless man from his dreams, who claims to have been repeatedly raped by aliens. He admits that "about six months later, the babies come out", and begs Ulysses to kill him. He refuses, but the man is electrocuted anyway by a live wire. Ford wakes up to find Cleopatra in his bedroom. Gabriel reappears to Ulysses. Carly breaks up with a drunken Jethro, who is subsequently raped by an alien.

== Production ==
=== Development ===
Gregg Araki was inspired to do television by the mystery series Twin Peaks, which he called "so ground-breaking and artistic and unusual and just its totally own thing". He directed episodes of several television series, but was hesitant to run his own show until he thought about the story potential of life in Los Angeles. Araki presented the idea to writer Karley Sciortino, who started working with him on the script. Gregory Jacobs, who had worked with Araki on Red Oaks, joined the project and brought in Steven Soderbergh. The production designer, costume designer, and director of photography have previously worked on other projects with Araki.

On March 26, 2018, it was announced that Starz had given Now Apocalypse a series order for a first season of ten episodes. The series is written by Araki and Sciortino, and directed by Araki. The series is executive produced by Soderbergh, Jacobs, and Araki. On December 10, 2018, it was announced that the series would premiere on March 10, 2019. On March 22, 2019, the eight remaining episodes of season one were released online and on demand. They also continued to air weekly.

Starz canceled the series after one season on July 26, 2019. Araki later stated that he was shopping the series to other networks.

=== Casting ===
In June 2018, it was announced that Avan Jogia, Kelli Berglund, Beau Mirchoff, and Roxane Mesquida had joined the main cast and that Evan Hart, Taylor Hart, Tyler Posey, Jacob Artist, Chris Aquilino, Desmond Chiam, RJ Mitte, and Grace Victoria Cox had been cast in recurring roles. On July 2, 2018, it was reported that Kevin Daniels and Avra Friedman had joined the cast in a recurring capacity.

=== Filming ===
The ten episodes of the series were shot in 40 days.

== Reception ==
=== Critical response ===
On Rotten Tomatoes the series holds an approval rating of 78% based on 32 reviews, with an average score of 6.42 out of 10. The website's critical consensus reads: "Marrying filmmaker Gregg Araki's frisky style with heady conspiracies and literary allusions, Now Apocalypse's bodacious aesthetics and philosophical pondering may prove too deliberately offbeat and garish for some." Metacritic assigned the series a weighted average score of 64 out of 100 based on 12 critics, indicating "generally favorable reviews".

=== Ratings ===
Viewership and ratings per episode of Now Apocalypse
No.	Title	Air date	Rating (18–49)	Viewers (millions)	DVR viewers (millions)	Total viewers (millions)
1	"This Is the Beginning of the End"	March 10, 2019	0.04	0.147	0.055	0.202
2	"Where Is My Mind?"	March 17, 2019	0.02	0.124	0.037	0.161
3	"The Rules of Attraction"	March 24, 2019	0.02	0.091	0.008	0.099
4	"The Downward Spiral"	March 31, 2019	0.02	0.082	0.020	0.102
5	"Stranger Than Paradise"	April 7, 2019	0.02	0.085	0.021	0.106
6	"She's Lost Control"	April 14, 2019	0.02	0.080	0.032	0.112
7	"Anywhere Out of the World"	April 21, 2019	0.01	0.052	0.014	0.066
8	"Unknown Pleasures"	April 28, 2019	0.01	0.093	0.045	0.138
9	"Disappear Here"	May 5, 2019	0.01	0.069	0.012	0.081
10	"Everything Is Gone Forever"	May 12, 2019	0.01	0.064	0.028	0.092
