= Karley Sciortino =

American writer

- Born: Highland, Ulster County, New York, United States
- Occupations: Writer; television host; producer; screenwriter
- Years active: 2007 - present
- Known for: Sex columns

Karley Sciortino is an American writer, television host, screenwriter, and producer. She is the founder of Slutever, a website that focuses on sex and sexuality, and executive producer and host of the Viceland documentary series of the same name. She also writes Vogue's online sex and relationships column, Breathless, and co-wrote and produced the 2026 film I Want Your Sex.

== Early life ==
Sciortino was born and raised in Highland, Ulster County, New York. She was raised Catholic in an Italian-American family. She later moved to London where she lived in a squatting commune.

== Career ==
=== Slutever ===
Sciortino started her blog Slutever in 2007 while living in London. Initially, the blog centered around her and roommates' sexual exploits and life in their squatting commune, but soon evolved into what The New York Times called "a chronicle of sexual experimentation."

In 2012, Sciortino and producer Adri Murguia started a web series called Slutever for Vice, which ran for three seasons. The series took a journalistic approach to exploring taboo aspects of modern sexuality, with Sciortino as host. In 2017, Sciortino and Murguia co-created a Viceland television series, also called Slutever, which built thematically off the webseries. The second season of Viceland's Slutever aired in 2019.

Sciortino's memoir Slutever: Dispatches from an Autonomous Woman in a Post Shame World was published by Grand Central Publishing (New York City) on February 6, 2018.

=== Now Apocalypse ===
Sciortino and Gregg Araki co-wrote the first season of Now Apocalypse (executive produced by Steven Soderbergh), a surreal comedy television show premiering on Starz in 2019. Sciortino is also the show's consulting producer. The series was cancelled after one season.

=== Television and film ===
In 2017, Sciortino starred in "Side Hustle," episode 3 of season 2 of Joe Swanberg's Netflix television show Easy.

Sciortino co-wrote the 2026 film I Want Your Sex, directed by Gregg Araki and starring Olivia Wilde and Cooper Hoffman. She started writing the script in 2013, based on a relationship she had with an older editor. In 2023, she rewrote the script with Araki, who suggested swapping the genders of the lead characters.

== Personal life ==
In 2010, Sciortino moved to New York City, and she currently lives between New York and Los Angeles. She has dated both men and women.
