= The Oak Room (film) =

- Film poster
- Directed by: Cody Calahan
- Written by: Peter Genoway
- Based on: The Oak Room by Peter Genoway
- Produced by: Chad Archibald; Mark Myers
- Starring: RJ Mitte; Ari Millen; Martin Roach; Nicholas Campbell; David Ferry; Peter Outerbridge
- Release date: August 2020 (Fantasia)
- Running time: 89 minutes
- Countries: Canada; USA
- Language: English

The Oak Room is a 2020 Canadian thriller film directed by Cody Calahan, produced by Citizen Skull Productions, and starring RJ Mitte, Ari Millen, Martin Roach, Nicholas Campbell, David Ferry and Peter Outerbridge. It is based on Peter Genoway's play of the same name.

== Plot ==
During a raging snowstorm, a drifter returns home to the blue-collar bar located in the remote Canadian town where he was born. When he offers to settle an old debt with a grizzled bartender by telling him a story, the night's events quickly spin into a dark tale of mistaken identities, double-crosses and shocking violence.

== Cast ==
- RJ Mitte as Steve
- Peter Outerbridge as Paul
- Ari Millen as Michael
- Martin Roach as Richard
- David Ferry as Kenneth
- Nicholas Campbell as Gordon
- Amos Crawley as Thomas Coward
- Avery Esteves as Young Michael
- Coal Campbell as Young Gordon
- Matt The Welder as Bar Patron

== Release ==
The film premiered at the Fantasia International Film Festival in August 2020.

== Reception ==
The film has a 90% approval rating on Rotten Tomatoes based on 42 reviews, with an average rating of 7/10. The website's critics consensus reads: "The Oak Room contains a taut, spooky tale that proves southern gothic can flourish in the snowy north." Brian Shaer of Film Threat gave the film a 6.5 out of 10. Drew Tinnin of Dread Central awarded the film three and a half stars out of five. Meagan Navarro of Bloody Disgusting awarded the film three skulls out of five.

Martin Unsworth of Starburst gave the film a positive review and wrote, "...The Oak Room is no facsimile and always feels like its own beast. The direction is taut, building the atmosphere gradually until the tension is practically smothering during the denouement - a final shot that rivals Blood Simple for satisfaction."

Andrew Mack of Screen Anarchy also gave the film a positive review and wrote, "The film proves once again that sometimes all you need is a good story to captivate your audience. The Oak Room has at least three."
