= Grace Victoria Cox =

American actress

- Born: March 10, 1995 (age 31); Lexington, Kentucky, U.S.
- Occupation: Actress
- Years active: 2014–present
- Spouse: Josh Zammit (m. 2025)

Grace Victoria Cox (born March 10, 1995) is an American actress. She is known for playing Melanie Cross in the CBS series Under the Dome (2014–2015), Veronica Sawyer in the Paramount Network series Heathers (2018), and Lexie in the Netflix series The Society (2019).

== Early life ==
Cox grew up in Lexington, Kentucky. She studied theatre at a high school for the arts, then a boarding school and, later, finished her senior year online. She described herself as introverted. In 2012, when she was 17, she moved to Los Angeles.

== Career ==
Cox's first role was in the second season of the CBS adaptation of Stephen King's Under the Dome in 2014. She played Melanie Cross, a new girl in Chester's Mill. She next had further television roles in Manson's Lost Girls in 2016 on Lifetime and an episode of Twin Peaks in 2017, and the films, Savage Youth and Affairs of State in 2018.

Her breakout role came later in 2018, when she was cast as Veronica Sawyer in Heathers, the modern-day Paramount television adaptation of the cult classic film. Despite the show's cancellation after its first season, The New Yorker praised her performance as "a strange pleasure."

In 2019, she was cast as Carol DaRonch in Extremely Wicked, Shockingly Evil and Vile, which starred Zac Efron as Ted Bundy. Her performance was praised by The Hollywood Outsider, claiming "she disappears into the role." The same year, she had a recurring role on The Society as Lexie and appeared in 2 episodes of the Starz series, Now Apocalypse.

From 2021 to 2022, she appeared in the film Triumph, a sports drama, as Patty, and appeared on an episode Magnum P.I. and Chicago Med.

== Personal life ==
In June 2025, Cox married Australian filmmaker and artist Josh Zammit. The couple announced their marriage via a post on Cox's Instagram account.

== Filmography ==
Film roles
Year	Title	Role	Ref.
2018	Savage Youth	Elena	
2018	Affairs of State	Darcy Baines	
2019	Extremely Wicked, Shockingly Evil and Vile	Carol DaRonch	
2021	Triumph	Patty	

Television roles
Year	Title	Role	Notes	Ref.
2014–2015	Under the Dome	Melanie Cross	Main role (season 2); guest role (season 3)	
2016	Manson's Lost Girls	Lynette "Squeaky" Fromme	Television film	
2017	Twin Peaks	Charlotte	Episode: "Part 5"	
2017	The Archer	Emily	Television film	
2018	Heathers	Veronica Sawyer	Main role	
2019	Now Apocalypse	Amber	2 episodes	
2019	The Society	Lexie	Recurring role, 8 episodes	
2021	Magnum P.I.	Chloe Dawson	Episode: "Bloodline"	
2022	Chicago Med	Kat Miller	Episode: "Lying Doesn't Protect You From The Truth"	
