= Blake Berris =

American actor (born 1984)

- Born: Blake Everett Berris; August 24, 1984 (age 42); Minneapolis, Minnesota, U.S.
- Occupation: Actor
- Years active: 2005–present
- Known for: Performance in American soap opera television
- Television: Days of Our Lives

Blake Everett Berris (born August 24, 1984) is an American actor. He played the role of Nick Fallon on NBC/Peacock's Days of Our Lives. In 2023, he returned to the soap in the role of Everett Lynch.

== Early life ==
Berris graduated from University of California, Los Angeles in three years as an acting major in the School of Theater, Film, and TV and went on to study and participate in a theater program at the University of Oxford.

== Career ==
In 2006, Berris joined the cast of NBC's Days of Our Lives in the role of Nick Fallon. In 2009, he exited the role. Following his exit, he appeared as a special guest star on series, such as: The Mentalist, Breaking Bad and Pretty Little Liars, among others. Berris reprised the role from 2012 to 2014, and again for a guest appearance in 2023. In 2021, he reprised the role in the Peacock original movie, A Very Salem Christmas.

In October 2023, Berris returned to Days of Our Lives in the newly created role of Everett Lynch. until July 2024 when he left the series..

== Awards ==
- 2009 – Daytime Emmy Awards – Outstanding Younger Actor – Nominated
- 2013 Gasparilla Film Festival - Rising Star Award for his role as Dusty Peterson in Meth Head
- 2013 FilmOut San Diego - Best Supporting Actor Award for his role as Dusty Peterson in Meth Head

== Filmography ==
Film
Year	Title	Role	Notes
2010	Mafiosa	Bruce Harris	
2010	Girlfriend	Actor on Television	Voice
2010	The Boys & Girls Guide to Getting Down	Keyvon	TV movie
2011	Minkow	Young Mike	
2011	Circling the Drain	Tim	TV movie
2012	This is Caroline	Michael	Short film
2012	Lisa	Stephen	Short film
2013	House of Last Things	Jesse	
2013	Meth Head	Dusty Peterson	
2013	La Cucaracha	Man	Short film
2019	Before You Know It	Brandt Wilfred	
2019	She's Missing	Gus	
2019	Never Grow Old	Fred	
2019	Forever in My Heart	Dave Jordan	Hallmark Movie
2021	Days of Our Lives: A Very Salem Christmas	Nick Fallon	Peacock Original Movie

Television
Year	Title	Role	Notes
2005	Numb3rs	Guy #1	Episode: Convergence
2006	Hannah Montana	Ghoul #1	Episode: "More Than a Zombie to Me"
2006–2009, 2012–2014, 2021, 2023	Days of Our Lives	Nick Fallon	Nominated for Daytime Emmy for 2009 Outstanding Young Actor in a Drama Series
2008	The Starter Wife	Corey	Episode: "Look Who's Stalking"; Episode: "The Diary of a Mad Ex-Housewife"; Episode: "The Forty Year-Old Virgin Queen"
2009	The Mentalist	Geoff / Rowan	Episode: "A Dozen Red Roses"
2011	Breaking Bad	Tucker	Episode: "Cornered"
2011	Prime Suspect	Gary Tibbits	Episode: "Shame"
2011	The Big Bang Theory	Kevin	Episode: "The Ornithophobia Diffusion"
2016	Pretty Little Liars	Damien	Episode: "The Gloves Are On"
2016	Supergirl	Gabriel Phillips	Episode: "Truth, Justice and the American Way"
2017	General Hospital	Damian Spinelli	Temporary recast
2023–2024	Days of Our Lives	Everett	Series regular; role held from October 30, 2023, to July 2024
