= Slutever (TV series) =

American television series

- Genre: Documentary
- Presented by: Karley Sciortino
- No. of seasons: 2
- No. of episodes: 18

Production
- Executive producers: Adri Murguia; Danielle Franco; Gena Konstantinakos; Karley Sciortino
- Running time: 22 minutes

Original release
- Network: Viceland
- Release: January 24, 2018 – March 31, 2019

Slutever is an American television series broadcast by Viceland, starting in January 2018. The show is inspired by the blog and book of the same name by author Karley Sciortino, and a webseries, called Slutever for Vice, that was hosted on Sciortino's Slutever blog. In April 2018, Viceland ordered a second season of the show, which premiered in February 2019. As of March 31, 2019, two seasons and 18 episodes have aired.

== Episodes ==
Season	Episodes	Originally released	
Season	Episodes	First released	Last released
1	10	January 24, 2018	March 28, 2018
2	8	February 10, 2019	March 31, 2019

=== Season 1 (2018) ===
No. overall	No. in season	Title	Original release date
1	1	"Happy Endings"	January 24, 2018
Sciortino looks for a massage for women with a "happy ending."
2	2	"Lifestyle Slaves"	January 31, 2018
Sciortino spends time with a dominatrix and her platonic lifestyle slave.
3	3	"Stoned Sex"	February 7, 2018
Sciortino explored the impacts of marijuana on orgasms and sex and meets in San Francisco with the creators of a "weed lube".
4	4	"Luxury Sex"	February 14, 2018
Sciortino explores the world of "luxury sex," including golden dildos and expensive sex toys, with the help of Dita Von Teese.
5	5	"Kinky Travel"	February 21, 2018
Sciortino investigates the "kink" travel industry and goes dungeon hunting with a specialized real estate agent.
6	6	"Trans Sexuality"	February 28, 2018
Sciortino meets with members of the transgender and transsexual communities, including Buck Angel to talk about sex.
7	7	"Cam Girls"	March 7, 2018
Sciortino meets with live sex cam operators to discover whether they think cams will replace online pornography.
8	8	"Robot Sex"	March 14, 2018
Sciortino meets the creators behind "sex robots" and other erotic AI to see what the future holds.
9	9	"Eco Sexuality"	March 21, 2018
Sciortino meets with so-called ecosexuals who believe that having sex with the Earth can save it.
10	10	"Monster Fantasy"	March 28, 2018
Sciortino investigates the world of monster erotica, including meeting the creators of a dragon dildo, and discovers that monster sex fantasies are more common than expected.

=== Season 2 (2019) ===
No. overall	No. in season	Title	Original release date
11	1	"VR Porn"	February 10, 2019
12	2	"Vagina Power"	February 17, 2019
13	3	"Poly Love"	February 24, 2019
14	4	"Alternative Sex Ed"	March 3, 2019
15	5	"Pet Play"	March 10, 2019
16	6	"Bisexual Men"	March 17, 2019
17	7	"Sugar Babies"	March 24, 2019
18	8	"Strippers"	March 31, 2019

== See also ==
- List of programs broadcast by Viceland
