= The Long Weekend (O' Despair) =

1989 film by Gregg Araki

- Directed by: Gregg Araki
- Written by: Gregg Araki
- Produced by: Gregg Araki
- Starring: Brett Vail
- Edited by: Gregg Araki
- Distributed by: Desperate Pictures
- Release date: 1989
- Running time: 87 minutes
- Country: United States
- Language: English
- Budget: $5,000

The Long Weekend (O' Despair) (stylized onscreen in lowercase) is a 1989 American low-budget drama film written, produced, edited and directed by Gregg Araki, and starring Brett Vail. The film follows three couples, one gay, one lesbian and one heterosexual, spending a weekend together.

== Cast ==
- Bretton Vail as Michael
- Maureen Dondanville as Rachel
- Andrea Beane as Leah
- Nicole Dillenberg as Sara
- Marcus D'Amico as Greg
- Lance Woods as Alex

== Production ==
Araki shot The Long Weekend in black and white on a budget of $5,000.

== Reception ==
The New York Times reviewer Vincent Canby congratulated Araki for making an attractive-appearing film on a minuscule budget but found the film hard to watch. Faulting the film's "extremely self-conscious, neo-sitcom dialogue", Canby felt that Araki's ingenuity as a filmmaker was not matched by his talent.

The Long Weekend (O' Despair) won the 1989 Los Angeles Film Critics Association Independent-Experimental Award.
