= Kaboom (film) =

2010 film by Gregg Araki

- Theatrical release poster
- Directed by: Gregg Araki
- Written by: Gregg Araki
- Produced by: Andrea Sperling; Gregg Araki
- Starring: Thomas Dekker; Haley Bennett; Chris Zylka; Roxane Mesquida; Juno Temple; Kelly Lynch
- Cinematography: Sandra Valde-Hansen
- Edited by: Gregg Araki
- Music by: Robin Guthrie; Ulrich Schnauss; Mark Peters; Vivek Maddala
- Production companies: Desperate Pictures; Wild Bunch; Super Crispy Entertainment
- Distributed by: Wild Bunch Distribution (France); IFC Films (United States)
- Release dates: May 15, 2010 (Cannes); October 6, 2010 (France); January 28, 2011 (United States)
- Running time: 86 minutes
- Countries: United States; France
- Language: English
- Box office: $635,162

Kaboom is a 2010 science fiction sex comedy mystery film written and directed by Gregg Araki and starring Thomas Dekker, Juno Temple, Haley Bennett, and James Duval. The film centers on the sexual adventures of a group of college students and their investigation of a bizarre cult.

Kaboom premiered at the 2010 Cannes Film Festival, where it was awarded the first-ever Queer Palm for its contribution to lesbian, gay, bisexual or transgender issues. The film was released theatrically in France on October 6, 2010, by Wild Bunch Distribution. In the United States, it was released by IFC Films on video on demand as part of Sundance Selects on January 22, 2011, and in select theaters on January 28.

== Plot ==
Smith, an 18-year-old film student, who describes his sexual orientation as "undeclared", has been having strange dreams recently. He is going to (university) with his best friend Stella, whom he has known since junior high, and finds a note saying he is the "chosen son." He has a roommate named Thor, whom he lusts after even though Thor is attracted to the opposite sex. Smith and Stella go to a party where Stella hooks up with a girl named Lorelei, whom Smith recognizes from one of his dreams. Later, a red-haired girl vomits on his shoe, and Smith also recognizes her from a dream. Smith eventually gets picked up by London, a female British student. They have sex, but to Smith's chagrin, she does not want to be with him except during sex.

Smith visits a nude beach and meets a man named Hunter. They start having sex, but Smith is disappointed to hear Hunter is married. Stella discovers Lorelei is not only unstable, but a witch with psychic problems caused by rejection. Stella keeps trying to dump her but has difficulty as Lorelei begins trying to kill her. Smith walks in on Thor and Thor's best friend, Rex, wrestling in their underwear. London seduces Rex, convincing him to have a three-way with her and Smith for Smith's 19th birthday.

During this time, Smith continues dreaming of the red-haired girl. In his dreams, they are both pursued by people wearing animal masks. Smith finds out that a girl was killed and her head cut off. He later meets Madeline, who appears to be the same red-haired girl. She tells him that she had a twin sister named Rebecca who was kidnapped many years ago by men wearing animal masks. Stella is attacked by Lorelei in a bathroom, but saves herself by spraying water on her, causing Lorelei to burn up.

The animal-masked people finally capture Smith, London, and Smith's mother. They are bundled into a van to be driven to meet the head of a secret cult. Smith learns that the cult leader is his father, although he was always told that his father died when Smith was young. The three also learn London is another child of the cult leader, making her and Smith half-siblings.

Stella, Oliver, and the perpetually stoned "Messiah" pursue the van. Oliver has powers like Lorelei's but uses them for good. It turns out that Oliver meeting Smith (and flirting with him) was not chance; he was trying to protect Smith from the cult. The Messiah was only acting stoned as a cover and also wishes to protect Smith. The animal-masked people turn out to be Thor, Rex, and Hunter, whose mission is to get London and Smith to a secret underground shelter to survive the explosion of dozens of nuclear bombs. Non-cult members will be annihilated, and the cult will take over the world with Smith as its leader.

The Messiah tries running the van off the road, and both vehicles accelerate towards a bridge that is down. Smith's father presses a button and the Earth explodes.

== Cast ==
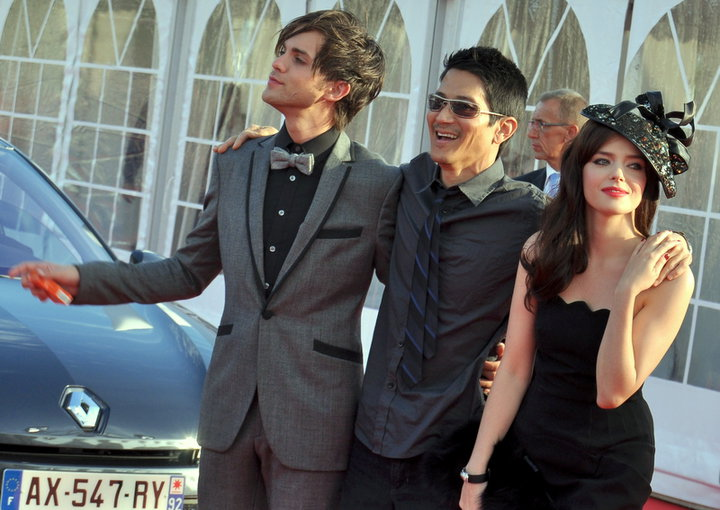
Thomas Dekker, Gregg Araki and Roxane Mesquida promoting the film at the 2010 Deauville American Film Festival

- Thomas Dekker as Smith
- Juno Temple as London
- Haley Bennett as Stella
- Roxane Mesquida as Lorelei/Laura
- Brennan Mejia as Oliver
- James Duval as The Messiah
- Kelly Lynch as Nicole
- Chris Zylka as Thor
- Nicole LaLiberte as Madeleine O'Hara/Rebecca Novak
- Andy Fischer-Price as Rex
- Jason Olive as Hunter
- Carlo Mendez as Milo
- Brandy Futch as Drug Fairy Nymph

== Reception ==
The film received mixed reviews from critics. On the review aggregator website Rotten Tomatoes, 59% of 105 critics' reviews are positive, with an average rating of 5.8/10. The website's consensus reads: "Jumbled and shallow yet easy to watch, Kaboom is a one-night stand that isn't meant to lead anywhere – but is fun enough while it lasts." On Metacritic, the film has a 64/100 rating from 24 reviews, indicating "generally favorable" reviews.

Bruce DeMara of the Toronto Star praised the film's cast and called it "Araki's most ambitious [film] to date, with a quick pace, music that's hip and cool and a mood that alternates between playful and eccentric." Sam Adams of Philadelphia City Paper was much more critical about it, and said it was "less a movie than a masturbatory doodle, a sloppy, shoddy regurgitation of Araki's pet trope that tries to pass off its slipshod structure as a free-wheeling lark."
