= Totally F***ed Up =

1993 film by Gregg Araki

- DVD cover
- Directed by: Gregg Araki
- Written by: Gregg Araki
- Produced by: Gregg Araki; Andrea Sperling
- Starring: James Duval; Roko Belic; Susan Behshid; Jenee Gill; Gilbert Luna; Lance May
- Cinematography: Gregg Araki
- Edited by: Gregg Araki
- Music by: Marston Daley (song); Al Jourgensen (song); Frank Nardiello (song)
- Distributed by: Strand Releasing
- Release dates: September 16, 1993 (TIFF); October 10, 1993 (United States)
- Running time: 78 minutes
- Country: United States
- Language: English
- Box office: $101,071

Totally F***ed Up (also known as Totally Fucked Up) is a 1993 American avant-garde drama film written and directed by Gregg Araki. As the first installment of Araki's Teenage Apocalypse film trilogy, it is considered a seminal entry in the new queer cinema genre.

The film chronicles the dysfunctional lives of six gay adolescents who have formed a family unit. Over the course of the movie, they struggle to get along with each other and with life in the face of various major obstacles. As classified by Araki, it is "a rag-tag story of the fag-and-dyke teen underground....a kinda cross between avant-garde experimental cinema and a queer John Hughes flick." Because of the film's 15-part structure and use of documentary-like interviews, it has earned comparison to Godard's Masculin Féminin (1966), which Araki has cited as significant inspiration. Totally F***ed Up first premiered at the 1993 Sundance Film Festival.

== Plot ==
Totally F***ed Up is concerned with six teenagers, four of whom are gay men, the other two a lesbian couple. The plot is episodic, spliced together with various segments and occasional tangents. The story itself is framed through the amateur documentary filmmaking of Steven, one of the teenagers, but it mainly follows a linear series of events. Araki has constructed the film in 15 parts, which is described in the opening titles.

The film follows the lives and romances of the teenagers. In terms of notable events, Steven and Deric break up due to Steven's infidelity, Deric is the victim of a gay bashing attack, and Michele and Patricia attempt to conceive a child. The narrative ultimately culminates at a climax where Andy dies of suicide. There is an epilogue-like reaction from the other five characters before the film ends.

== Cast ==
- James Duval as Andy
- Roko Belic as Tommy
- Susan Behshid as Michele
- Jenee Gill as Patricia
- Gilbert Luna as Steven
- Lance May as Deric
- Alan Boyce as Ian
- Craig Gilmore as Brendan
- Nicole Dillenberg as Dominatrix
- Michael Costanza as Everett

== Production ==
As a smaller production with "virtually no crew," Gregg Araki himself operated as cinematographer, accompanied by a sound person, the producer/PA and necessary cast members depending on what scene was being shot. The film was recorded using a 16 mm film camera. Without a production designer, Araki also scouted locations that "had a weird surreal quality to them". In terms of casting, to ensure that the film felt authentic, Araki chose real teenagers to embody each of the roles.

== Style ==
Totally F***ed Up makes extensive use of a handheld video camcorder, which one of the characters uses to provide insight into the lives of other characters through interview-like discussion. The technique — first seen in a major theatrical release with Sex, Lies, and Videotape (1989) — became popular throughout the 1990s, evident also in later films such as Reality Bites (1994), American Beauty (1999), and The Blair Witch Project (1999). Araki revisited the camcorder idea in his 1997 film Nowhere.

== Themes ==
=== Adolescence and queer identity ===
As part of the new queer cinema movement, a term coined and established by B. Ruby Rich, the film initially set itself apart in its narrative and aesthetic representations of queer identity. With the significant increase in gay and lesbian movies during the 1990s as a response to the AIDS crisis, Rich noted how these projects were "irreverent, energetic, alternately minimalist and excessive. Above all, they’re full of pleasure. They’re here, they’re queer, get hip to them." Much like Cheryl Dunye's The Watermelon Woman or Todd Haynes' Poison, Totally F***ed Up fit within this niche of cinema that was experimental, political, and featured queer characters at the forefront of the narrative. Throughout the film, the group of teenagers for the most part are fully out and sure of their respective sexualities. By focusing on queer teenagers specifically, Araki considers the tumultuous political climate and how issues of love, romance and break-ups operates differently in relation to the queer community. While the characters try to hold onto their friendships and partnerships at a formative moment in their lives, the question of safety and larger social repercussions looms large.

=== LA life and culture ===
Like the rest of the Teenage Apocalypse film trilogy, LA serves as an important backdrop for the cast of characters to grapple with issues of loneliness and isolation. Although the group of teenagers achieves a sense of queer community behind doors, it is the reality of 1990s American politics within the broader landscape of the city that enforces various social pressures. Not only is there an expectation for the group to be or act a certain way, the consumerist culture of LA is ever-present and inescapable. Although the characters seek to exist outside of the mainstream, the larger culture of the city makes it almost impossible. As an LA native himself, Araki also noted that his experiences growing up informed the logic of the film, stating that the project is "filled with that kind of like L.A. talk and shopping malls."

== Home media ==
The film was released on Region 1 DVD on June 28, 2005. The film also has a region 2 release in the UK and Germany. These releases feature a commentary track with Araki, Luna and Duval. On September 24, 2024, The Criterion Collection released the film as part of its Gregg Araki's Teen Apocalypse Trilogy set. The film was restored in 2K resolution.

== Reception ==
In a negative review for Variety, Todd McCarthy called the film "a rather stale serving" and "murkier and harder to watch than Araki’s last picture." He criticized the film's "arbitrary structure and lack of interesting characters" as well as "the passive, victimized mind-set of [Araki's] characters."

In The Austin Chronicle, Steve Davis wrote that the film centers on teens who are “disengaged from everything, both as a function of their age and sexual identity,” praising Araki’s unpolished style for amplifying this detachment. Davis also stated appreciation for how "there's little angst about being queer" in the film. He cited how the narrative instead explores "the emotional baggage associated with being gay or lesbian," thus offering a refreshing and nuanced perspective.

Los Angeles Times critic Kevin Thomas noted that "Araki presents none of his young people, all of whom are played so expertly by his cast, as gay stereotypes but rather as indistinguishable in dress and mannerisms from other L.A. teen-agers," commending the film's rejection of caricature and its representational performances, adding to the reception of the film's authenticity.

In a 2005 interview with IndieWire, Araki said that young people are still being moved by his work "and there’s a whole new generation of kids accessing the Trilogy via DVDs, etc.," solidifying its status.

== Year-end lists ==
- 6th – Kevin Thomas, Los Angeles Times

== See also ==
- The Doom Generation (1995)
- Nowhere (1997)
- Independent film
