= Nowhere (1997 film) =

1997 film by Gregg Araki

- Theatrical release poster
- Directed by: Gregg Araki
- Written by: Gregg Araki
- Produced by: Andrea Sperling; Gregg Araki
- Starring: James Duval; Rachel True; Nathan Bexton; Chiara Mastroianni; Debi Mazar; Kathleen Robertson; Joshua Gibran Mayweather; Jordan Ladd; Christina Applegate; Sarah Lassez; Guillermo Díaz; Jeremy Jordan; Alan Boyce; Jaason Simmons; Ryan Phillippe; Heather Graham; Scott Caan; Thyme Lewis; Mena Suvari
- Cinematography: Arturo Smith
- Edited by: Gregg Araki
- Production companies: Desperate Pictures; Blurco; Why Not Productions
- Distributed by: Fine Line Features (United States); Haut et Court (France)
- Release dates: May 9, 1997 (United States); September 17, 1997 (France)
- Running time: 82 minutes
- Countries: United States; France
- Language: English
- Box office: $194,201

Nowhere is a 1997 surrealist drama film written and directed by Gregg Araki. Described by Araki as "Beverly Hills, 90210 on acid", the film follows a day in the lives of a group of Los Angeles college students and the strange lives that they lead. It stars an ensemble cast led by James Duval and Rachel True.

The film is Araki's sixth overall and third entry in his Teenage Apocalypse film trilogy, preceded by Totally F***ed Up (1993) and The Doom Generation (1995). Like the other films in the trilogy, it contains scenes of graphic violence and sexuality. The film notably includes several cast members on the verge of stardom, including Ryan Phillippe, Mena Suvari, Kathleen Robertson, and Denise Richards.

Initial reception was mixed, though in subsequent years it has garnered a cult status and its reputation among critics has grown.

== Plot ==
In Los Angeles, Dark and Mel are a bisexual couple in an open relationship. Mel is dating a girl named Lucifer, whom Dark hates, while Dark is interested in a mysterious boy named Montgomery. Dark, Mel, and Lucifer meet up at a café they frequent, where they encounter other teenagers they know, such as Alyssa, Dingbat, and Egg and Dark's friend Cowboy, and they discuss a party being held that night by a man they know named Jujyfruit. Egg runs into an unnamed TV star from Baywatch.

Cowboy tells Dark about his boyfriend Bart's heroin addiction. He offers Bart the chance to fix their relationship if he stops using drugs, but he declines. Alyssa and Dingbat meet with Ducky, Egg's brother and Dingbat's crush, before Alyssa meets up with her boyfriend Elvis. While waiting at a bus stop, Dark witnesses three valley girls killed by an alien, which he tries to catch on video before it disappears.

At the Baywatch star's place, he and Egg watch TV together before he tries to make a move on her. She rejects his advances, and he violently rapes her. Dark and his friends play a drug-induced game of kick the can, during which Montgomery gets abducted by the same alien from earlier, whom Dark encounters in a locker room. Egg and Bart both return home and watch the same televangelist, Moses Helper, on TV, who encourages the two to commit suicide in order to reach heaven.

When he fails to convince Mel to become monogamous at Jujyfruit's party, Dark goes outside and is joined by Dingbat. Suddenly, Ducky, after hearing about his sister's suicide, leaps into a swimming pool, with Dingbat performing CPR on him. Returning to the party, Dark enters a kitchen where he sees the same alien from earlier. He meets with Handjob and begins to tell him about his day before Alyssa and Elvis arrive. Elvis claims Handjob sold him bad drugs and beats him to death with a can of tomato soup.

Dark returns home and records a diary entry on his video camera, saying how he is "totally doomed". As he attempts to sleep, Montgomery knocks on his window. Dark lets him in as he explains that he was abducted and experimented on by aliens who intend to invade Earth. The two lie down in bed together and Montgomery asks if he can spend the night, with Dark agreeing only if he promises to never leave. The two close their eyes but are disturbed as Montgomery goes into a coughing fit, then explodes into a shower of blood, leaving only a cockroach-like alien who utters, "I'm outta here", before crawling out of the window. A blood-covered Dark sits in stunned silence, before screaming out in horror and anguish.

== Cast ==
- James Duval as "Dark"
- Rachel True as Mel
- Nathan Bexton as Montgomery
- Chiara Mastroianni as Kriss
- Debi Mazar as "Kozy"
- Kathleen Robertson as "Lucifer"
- Joshua Gibran Mayweather as "Zero"
- Jordan Ladd as Alyssa
- Christina Applegate as "Dingbat"
- Sarah Lassez as "Egg"
- Guillermo Diaz as "Cowboy"
- Jeremy Jordan as Bart
- Alan Boyce as "Handjob"
- Jaason Simmons as the teen idol
- Ryan Phillippe as Shad
- Heather Graham as Lilith
- Scott Caan as "Ducky"
- Thyme Lewis as Elvis
- Mena Suvari as Zoe
- Beverly D'Angelo as Dark's mom
- Denise Richards as Jana
- Teresa Hill as Shannon
- Traci Lords as val-chick 1
- Shannen Doherty as val-chick 2
- Rose McGowan as val-chick 3
- John Ritter as Moses Helper
- Charlotte Rae as Fortune Teller
- Christopher Knight as Mr. Sighvatssohn
- Eve Plumb as Mrs. Sighvatssohn
- Lauren Tewes as Julie, the newscaster
- David Leisure as Egg and Ducky's dad
- Devon Odessa as "What"
- Staci Keanan as "Ever"
- Gibby Haynes as "Jujyfruit"
- Gregg Araki as cockroach alien (voice, uncredited)

== Release ==
In the summer of 1997, it received a limited North American theatrical release. The theatrical release was handled by Fine Line Features, an indie/arthouse division of New Line Cinema, which itself was owned by Time Warner. During October 1997, it was also screened at the BFI London Film Festival in the United Kingdom. In Japan, it was released theatrically on August 3, 1998.

=== Reception ===
Nowhere received mixed reviews from critics. On the review aggregator website Rotten Tomatoes, the film holds an approval rating of 50% based on 14 reviews, with an average score of 4/10. Metacritic, which uses a weighted average, assigned the film a score of 44 out of 100, based on 16 critics, indicating "mixed or average" reviews.

On August 19, 1997, Marc Savlov of The Austin Chronicle called it as "beautifully messy" as Araki's previous films Totally F***ed Up and The Doom Generation, but added that "this time Araki employs a far broader and more complex character canvas than previously." The Los Angeles Times gave the film a positive review, calling it "high energy" and stating that "Araki is a marvel at controlling shifting tones, and Nowhere, a confident, intricate work, has a great pop art look, yet its emotions are real."

On June 13, 1997, the Chicago Sun-Times referred to it as Araki's "most expensive and mainstream film", while in 1997, The New York Times described Nowhere as "California's version of Kids", adding that "if it weren't so overpopulated and desperate to shock, Nowhere might have succeeded as a maliciously cheery satire of Hollywood brats."

Writing for Empire, Jake Hamilton gave the film a negative review, stating, "True, there are some dazzling scenes; a brilliant intercutting sex-scene; death by a Campbell's soup tin and a ridiculously absurd finale, but compared to the likes of Richard Linklater's endearing Dazed and Confused, Nowhere is completely lost up its own arse." Canada's Globe and Mail wrote on June 14, 1997 that "you can find more entertaining absurdities and thrilling nihilism from watching the average episode of Melrose Place or Beverly Hills, 90210."

Araki himself described the film as "Beverly Hills, 90210 on acid", with several reviewers also using this description for it at the time of release. In a retrospective article on the film in Nylon, Marie Lodi wrote, "Nowhere's surreal and hyper-saturated visuals were just as ahead of its time as its themes."

=== Home media ===
In the United States, the film was released on VHS. On December 10, 1997, it was also released on LaserDisc in the United States by Image Entertainment, who handled many other LaserDisc releases.

Elsewhere, it was made available on DVD in the United Kingdom, where it was released on a Region 2 DVD. It was later re-released in the United Kingdom in 2013 featuring a commentary track with Gregg Araki, James Duval, Rachel True, and Jordan Ladd. For Australia, it was released on VHS in late 1997, and then received a 2005 DVD release by 20th Century Fox Home Entertainment South Pacific. In Australia, it garnered an R18+ rating (equivalent to an NC-17 rating in the U.S.) due to a combination of sexual references, drug references and medium level violence. However, in the U.S. itself, the film received a less restrictive rating by the MPAA.

Strand Releasing announced plans to release a 4K restoration of Nowhere, including scenes removed from the theatrical version for MPAA ratings purposes, in late 2023. On September 16, 2023, the restoration debuted alongside The Doom Generation and Totally F***ed Up, Araki's other films in his Teen Apocalypse trilogy, at the Academy Museum of Motion Pictures in Los Angeles. On September 24, 2024, The Criterion Collection released this restored version of the film as part of its Gregg Araki's Teen Apocalypse Trilogy set.

== Soundtrack ==
The soundtrack to the film, Nowhere: Music from the Gregg Araki Movie, was released on Mercury Records in 1997.

Nowhere: Music from the Gregg Araki Movie

Soundtrack album by various artists
- Released: 1997
- Recorded: 1991–1997
- Length: 64:05
- Label: Mercury

=== Track listing ===
1. Intro
2. 311 – "Freak Out"
3. Radiohead – "How Can You Be Sure"
4. Elastica – "In the City"
5. Hole – "Dicknail"
6. The Chemical Brothers – "Life Is Sweet" (Daft Punk Remix)
7. Massive Attack – "Daydreaming" (Blacksmith Remix)
8. Coco and the Bean – "Killing Time" (Qureysh – Eh? 1 Remix)
9. Catherine Wheel – "Intravenous"
10. Curve – "Nowhere"
11. Lush – "I Have the Moon"
12. Ruby – "Flippin' tha Bird" (Ceasefire Remix)
13. James – "Thursday Treatments"
14. Chuck D – "Generation Wrekked" (Danny Saber Rock Remix)
15. Marilyn Manson – "Kiddie Grinder" (Remix)
16. Suede – "Trash"

Songs featured in the film that do not appear on the soundtrack album include:

- Slowdive – "Avalyn II"
- Stacy Q – "Two of Hearts"
- Cocteau Twins – "Seekers Who Are Lovers" (The Otherness Mix)
- Babyland – "Five Fingers"
- Scylla – "Get a Helmet"
- Sonic Youth – "Hendrix Necro"
- The Future Sound of London – "Papua New Guinea" (Graham Massey Mix)
- Blur – "She's So High"
- The Verve – "Grey Skies"
- Nine Inch Nails – "Memorabilia"
- Mojave 3 – "Tryin' to Reach You"
- Filter – "Take Another"
- Seefeel – "Air-Eyes"
- The Jesus and Mary Chain – "In the Black"
- Nitzer Ebb – "Kick It"
- Seefeel – "Time to Find Me (Come Inside)"
- Portishead – "Mourning Air"
- Adorable – "Vendetta"
- Redd Kross – "Out of My Tree"
- Coil – "The Snow: Answers Come in Dreams"
- My Life with the Thrill Kill Kult – "The Next Room of the Dream"
- Flying Saucer Attack – "Land Beyond the Sun"
- Filter – "Dose" (The Critter Mix)
- The The – "Love Is Stronger Than Death"

== Here Now (2015) ==
In 2015, French fashion house Kenzo commissioned a short film from Araki that would feature the label's fall/winter campaign. The short, titled Here Now, serves as a sequel to Nowhere and is set sometime soon after the film's events.
