= I Want Your Sex (film) =

2026 film by Gregg Araki

- Theatrical release poster
- Directed by: Gregg Araki
- Written by: Karley Sciortino; Gregg Araki
- Produced by: Gregg Araki; Seth Caplan; Teddy Schwarzman; Michael Heimler; Courtney L. Cunniff; Karley Sciortino
- Starring: Olivia Wilde; Cooper Hoffman; Mason Gooding; Chase Sui Wonders; Johnny Knoxville; Margaret Cho; Roxane Mesquida; Charli XCX; Daveed Diggs
- Cinematography: Tucker Korte
- Edited by: Gregg Araki; Victor de la Parra
- Music by: James Clements
- Production company: Black Bear Pictures
- Distributed by: Magnolia Pictures
- Release dates: January 23, 2026 (Sundance); July 31, 2026 (United States)
- Running time: 90 minutes
- Country: United States
- Language: English
- Box office: $2.4 million

I Want Your Sex is a 2026 American erotic comedy thriller film directed by Gregg Araki and written by Karley Sciortino and Araki. It stars Olivia Wilde, Cooper Hoffman, Mason Gooding, Chase Sui Wonders, Johnny Knoxville, Margaret Cho, Roxane Mesquida, Charli XCX, and Daveed Diggs. The film combines elements of a crime procedural with parody of both contemporary art and BDSM sexual practices.

The film premiered at the Sundance Film Festival on January 23, 2026, and was released by Magnolia Pictures in the United States on July 31, 2026. It received positive reviews from critics.

== Plot ==
Elliot, the 23-year-old assistant and lover of renowned contemporary artist Erika Tracy, discovers her floating unconscious in the swimming pool at her home.

Nine and a half weeks earlier, Elliot is unemployed and living with his best friend, Apple, when Erika hires him as a studio assistant. Dissatisfied with his relationship with his girlfriend, Minerva, he becomes attracted to Erika. The two begin a sexual relationship in which Erika assumes a dominant role. Despite warnings from her business manager, Vikktor, Elliot grows increasingly attached to her and breaks up with Minerva.

As Erika prepares for a major exhibition, she asks Elliot to bring another partner to her home, and he invites Apple. The encounter deteriorates when Erika disregards Elliot’s boundaries, causing a confrontation that also damages his friendship with Apple. Apple subsequently asks him to move out, and he stays with his fellow studio assistant, Zap.

At the exhibition’s opening, Elliot discovers that Erika has incorporated recordings of their sexual encounters into her work. When he confronts her, she pretends not to know him and has him removed from the gallery. The exhibition initially fails, and publicity surrounding their confrontation further damages Erika’s reputation.

Erika later summons Elliot to her home, where she gives him champagne and becomes aggressive when he rejects her advances. He loses consciousness and awakens to find her in the pool. Unable to revive her, he calls emergency services, but her body disappears before help arrives. Police question Elliot about her apparent death but release him for lack of evidence.

Erika subsequently visits Elliot and reveals that she and Vikktor orchestrated the gallery confrontation and drugged him so she could fake her death. Publicity surrounding her disappearance caused the exhibition to sell out, rescuing the studio financially. Elliot is furious, but Erika encourages him to exploit the scandal to advance his own career.

Two years later, Elliot is a successful podcaster and interviews Erika about her book recounting the hoax. She departs with a new submissive partner, promising to remain in contact. A further two years later, Elliot and Erika appear to marry, but Erika’s face melts after their wedding kiss. The wedding is revealed to be a nightmare from which they both awaken in separate beds.

== Cast ==
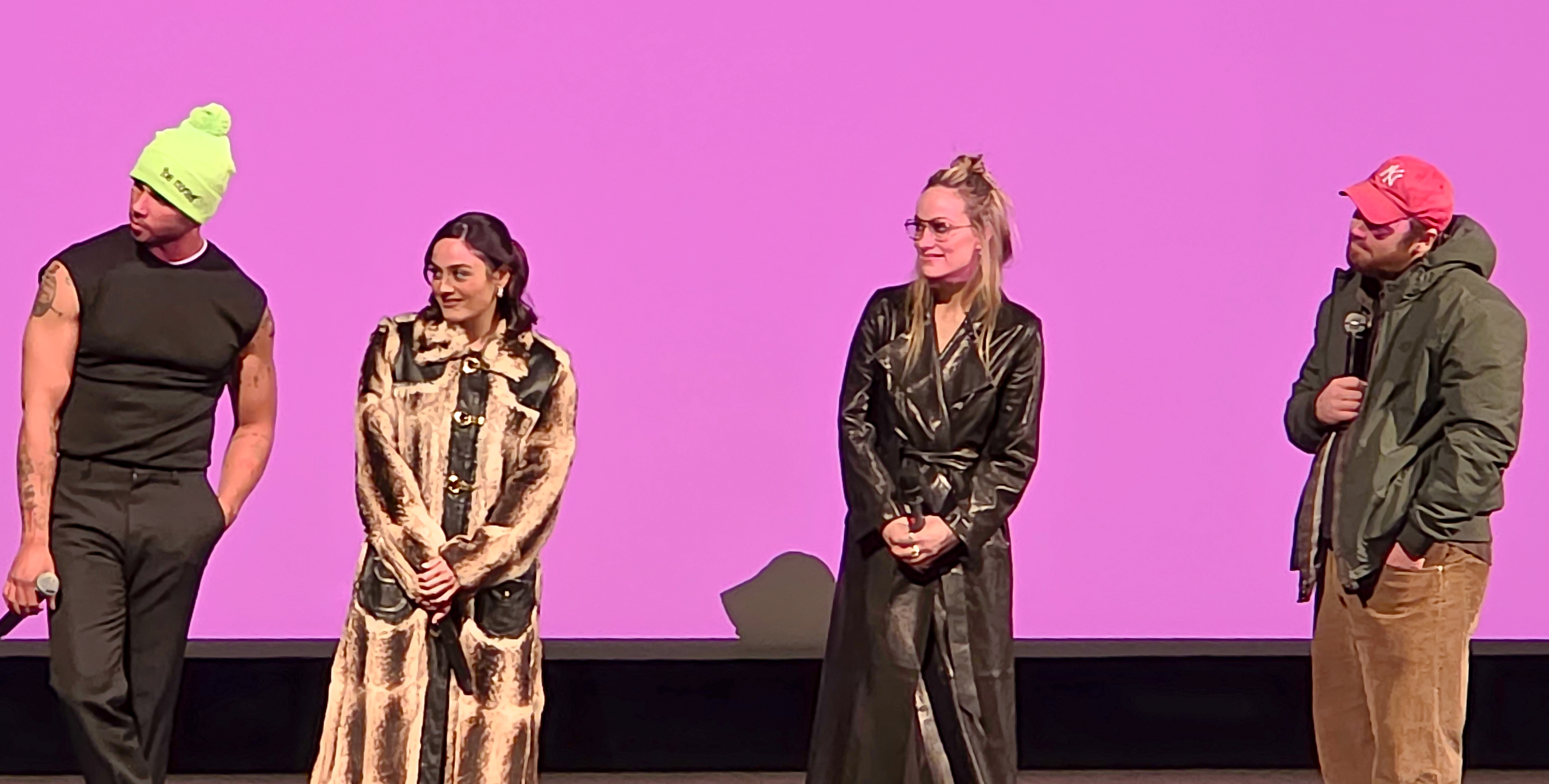
Mason Gooding, Chase Sui Wonders, Olivia Wilde, and Cooper Hoffman at the film's premiere at the 2026 Sundance Film Festival

- Olivia Wilde as Erika Tracy, a renowned provocative artist and Elliot's lover
- Cooper Hoffman as Elliot Bell, a naive young man who becomes Erika's new assistant and muse
- Mason Gooding as Zap, Elliot's co-worker
- Chase Sui Wonders as Apple, Elliot's best friend and roommate
- Johnny Knoxville as Detective Zem, a police officer
- Margaret Cho as Detective Zola, a police officer
- Roxane Mesquida as Yvette
- Charli XCX as Minerva, a graduate student and Elliot's girlfriend
- Daveed Diggs as Vikktor, Erika's business manager
- Michael Hitchcock and Nathan Bexton as the Bruces
- Darcy Marta as Margaret Epstein
- James Duval as the justice of the peace

== Production ==
=== Development and casting ===
In May 2024, it was reported that a thriller film directed by Gregg Araki and co-written by Karley Sciortino titled I Want Your Sex was in development, with Olivia Wilde cast in the lead role. In August, Cooper Hoffman joined the cast as Elliot and Charli XCX joined in an undisclosed role. In late October, Daveed Diggs, Mason Gooding, Chase Sui Wonders, Johnny Knoxville, and Margaret Cho joined the cast. In November, Roxane Mesquida revealed that she had joined the film. The film also features a cameo appearance by pornographic actor Christian Wilde.

The screenplay originally centered on a young woman and her older male boss. After revisiting the script years later, Araki and Sciortino reversed the characters' genders, resulting in the relationship between the older Erika and younger Elliot.

Araki was initially uncertain about casting Hoffman as Elliot, having associated him with his younger role in Licorice Pizza. After Hoffman submitted a self-taped audition, he flew from New York to Los Angeles for a chemistry read with Olivia Wilde. Araki said their chemistry and Hoffman's presence convinced him that Hoffman was right for the role. Christian Wilde was cast at Araki's insistence on hiring a pornographic actor with a large penis, as he felt it inappropriate to ask mainstream actors about their penis size. Araki also cited Wilde's reported professionalism, explaining that, because Wilde would appear in the same scene as XCX, he did not want "some kind of creepy dude" in the role.

=== Filming ===
Principal photography began on October 2, 2024, in Los Angeles. Filming wrapped on October 27.

== Release ==
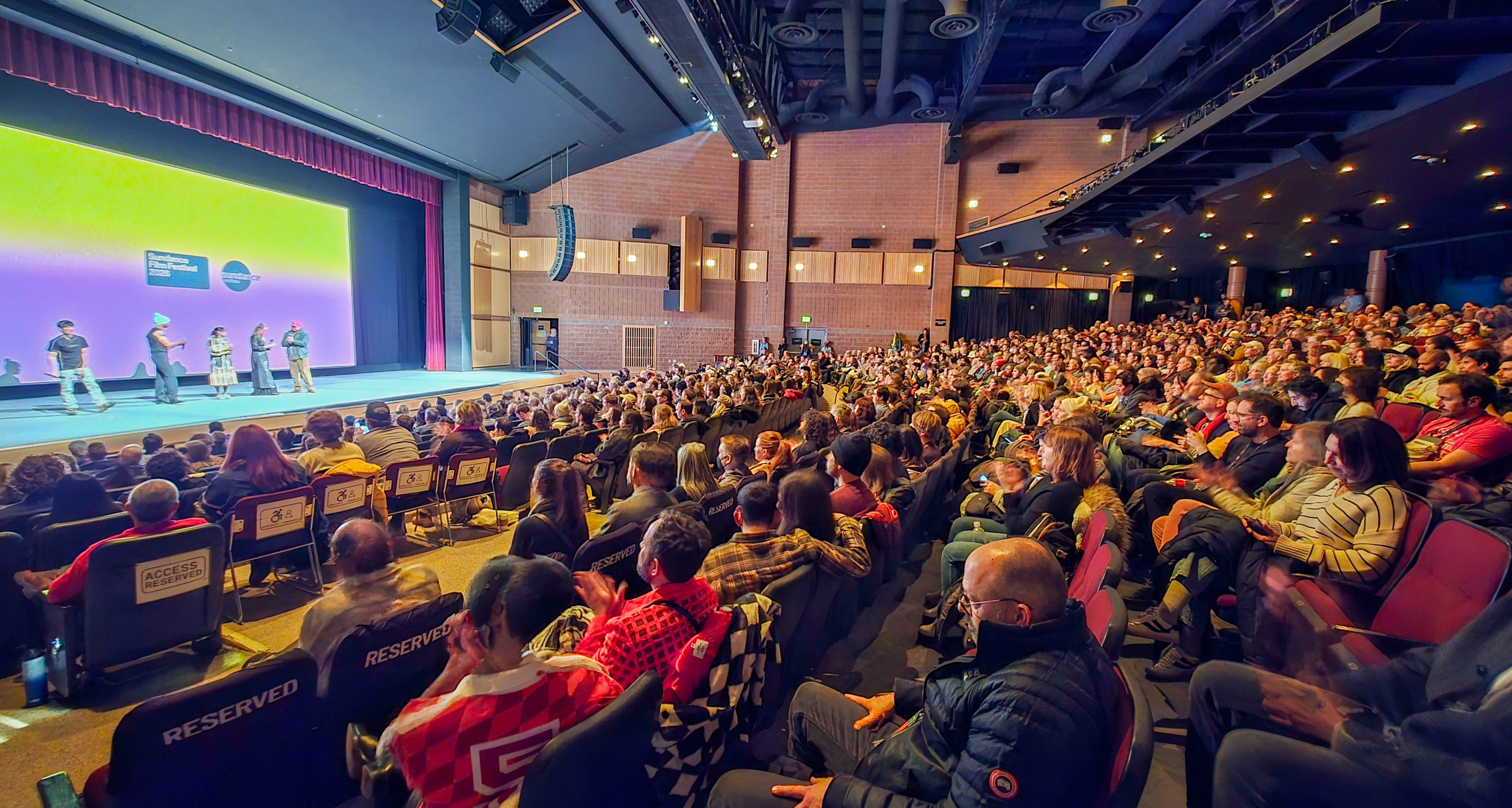
I Want Your Sex premiere during the 2026 Sundance Film Festival

I Want Your Sex premiered at the 2026 Sundance Film Festival on January 23, 2026. In February 2026, Magnolia Pictures acquired U.S. distribution rights to the film in a seven-figure deal. The film also screened at the 43rd Miami Film Festival on April 13, 2026, the 23rd Indianapolis Film Festival on April 24, 2026, the 73rd Sydney Film Festival on June 4, 2026, and had its UK premiere at the 79th Edinburgh International Film Festival on August 17, 2026.

The film was released theatrically in the United States on July 31, 2026.

== Reception ==
On Rotten Tomatoes, 91% of 174 critic reviews are positive; the average rating is 7.3 out of 10. The website's consensus reads: "One of indie stalwart Gregg Araki's most accessible works yet, this bawdy dramedy leverages well-judged performances by Olivia Wilde and Cooper Hoffman to deliver incisive commentary on carnality and connection." Metacritic, which uses a weighted average, assigns the film a score of 67 out of 100, based on 39 critics, indicating "generally favorable" reviews.
