= The Doom Generation =

1995 film by Gregg Araki

- Theatrical release poster
- Directed by: Gregg Araki
- Written by: Gregg Araki
- Produced by: Gregg Araki; Andrea Sperling; Yves Marmion
- Starring: James Duval; Rose McGowan; Johnathon Schaech
- Cinematography: Jim Fealy
- Edited by: Gregg Araki; Kate McGowan
- Music by: Dan Gatto
- Production companies: UGC; The Teen Angst Movie Company; Desperate Pictures; Blurco; Why Not Productions
- Distributed by: Trimark Pictures (United States); Haut et Court (France)
- Release dates: January 26, 1995 (Sundance); October 27, 1995 (United States); November 15, 1995 (France)
- Running time: 83 minutes
- Countries: United States; France
- Language: English
- Budget: $800,000
- Box office: $284,785

The Doom Generation is a 1995 independent black comedy thriller film co-edited, produced, written, and directed by Gregg Araki. The film stars James Duval and Rose McGowan as two troubled teenage lovers who pick up an adolescent drifter, played by Johnathon Schaech, and embark on a journey full of sex, violence, and convenience stores.

Billed as "A Heterosexual Movie by Gregg Araki", The Doom Generation is the second installment in the director's trilogy known as the Teenage Apocalypse film trilogy, preceded by Totally F***ed Up (1993) and followed by Nowhere (1997). The characters of Amy Blue and Jordan White are based on the Mark Beyer comic strip Amy and Jordan.

Araki's major film debut, shooting primarily took place at night during January 1994 in Los Angeles on a budget of $800,000. The crew avoided well known landmarks and shot in undeveloped areas of urban sprawl to give an apocalyptic feel. The budget allowed Araki to hire professional crew, making it the first of his films not shot by himself.

The film premiered at the Sundance Film Festival on January 26, 1995. It received mixed reviews from critics. During the press screening, many critics left. However, at the San Francisco International Film Festival (SFIFF), it received critical acclaim, most proclaiming it as Araki's breakthrough. Distributed by Trimark Pictures, it was released in the United States on October 27, 1995. While not a financial success, earning only $284,785 at the box office, McGowan was nominated for Best Debut Performance at the 11th Independent Spirit Awards.

== Plot ==
Teenage lovers Jordan White and Amy Blue pick up a handsome drifter named Xavier Red while driving home from a club. Jordan gives Xavier the nickname "X". A late-night stop at a convenience store leaves the three on the run when X accidentally kills the store's owner, forcing the trio to hide in a motel to avoid arrest.

Jordan and Amy have sex in the bathtub, while X watches and masturbates from behind the bathroom door. X then learns from the local television news program that the store owner's wife disemboweled her children with a machete before committing suicide. This leads X to believe that the trio won't be considered suspects or be found by police.

Later that evening, Amy has sex with X, despite their mutual dislike of each other. Eventually Jordan finds out, and things become tense as the two men develop a lingering sexual attraction for one another. As the trio journeys around the suburbs of Los Angeles, they continue to get into violent situations due to people either claiming to be Amy's previous lovers or mistaking her for such. She is mistakenly identified by a fast food window clerk as "Sunshine" and later by another character as "Kitten". These incidents get the attention of the FBI, and their goal is to find Amy and kill her.

Jordan, Amy and X spend the night in an abandoned warehouse, where they engage in a threesome. While Amy goes to urinate, Jordan and X are attacked by a trio of neo-Nazis, one of whom had previously mistaken Amy for his ex-girlfriend "Bambi".

The gang first severely beats up X, then holds Jordan down as the aforementioned neo-Nazi ties up and rapes Amy on top of an American flag. The group finally cuts off Jordan's penis with pruning shears and forces the severed penis into X's mouth. After Amy breaks free, she kills the neo-Nazis with the shears and escapes with X, leaving Jordan for dead. The film ends with Amy and X driving in her car. X offers Amy a Dorito, to no reply. Aimless on an empty road, the credits roll.

== Cast ==
- Rose McGowan as Amy Blue
- James Duval as Jordan White
- Johnathon Schaech as Xavier "X" Red
- Dustin Nguyen as Nguyen Coc Suc, the convenience store clerk
- Margaret Cho as Nguyen's wife
- Parker Posey as Brandi
- Lauren Tewes and Christopher Knight as TV anchorpeople
- Nicky Katt as Bartholomew, Carnoburger cashier
- Amanda Bearse as Barmaid
- Cress Williams as Peanut
- Skinny Puppy as Gang of goons
- Perry Farrell as Stop 'n' Go clerk
- Heidi Fleiss as Liquor store clerk
- Khristofor Rossianov as Don

== Release ==
=== Home media ===
The film was initially acquired by the Samuel Goldwyn Company, but was dropped due to content objections, before being picked up by Trimark Pictures. Its home video release had many cuts and differed greatly from the theatrical released. On May 28, 1996, a LaserDisc of the film was released in the United States by Vidmark Entertainment. A LaserDisc was also released in Hong Kong during 1996, with this release being handled by ERA Home Entertainment.

In Australia, it was released on DVD in 2005 by 20th Century Fox Home Entertainment South Pacific. It had earlier received a small Australian theatrical release during late 1995. In March 2012, the UK company Second Sight Films released a DVD with anamorphic widescreen and director/cast commentary. Previous releases up until this point lacked the commentary, with many lacking the widescreen format.

=== Director's cut ===
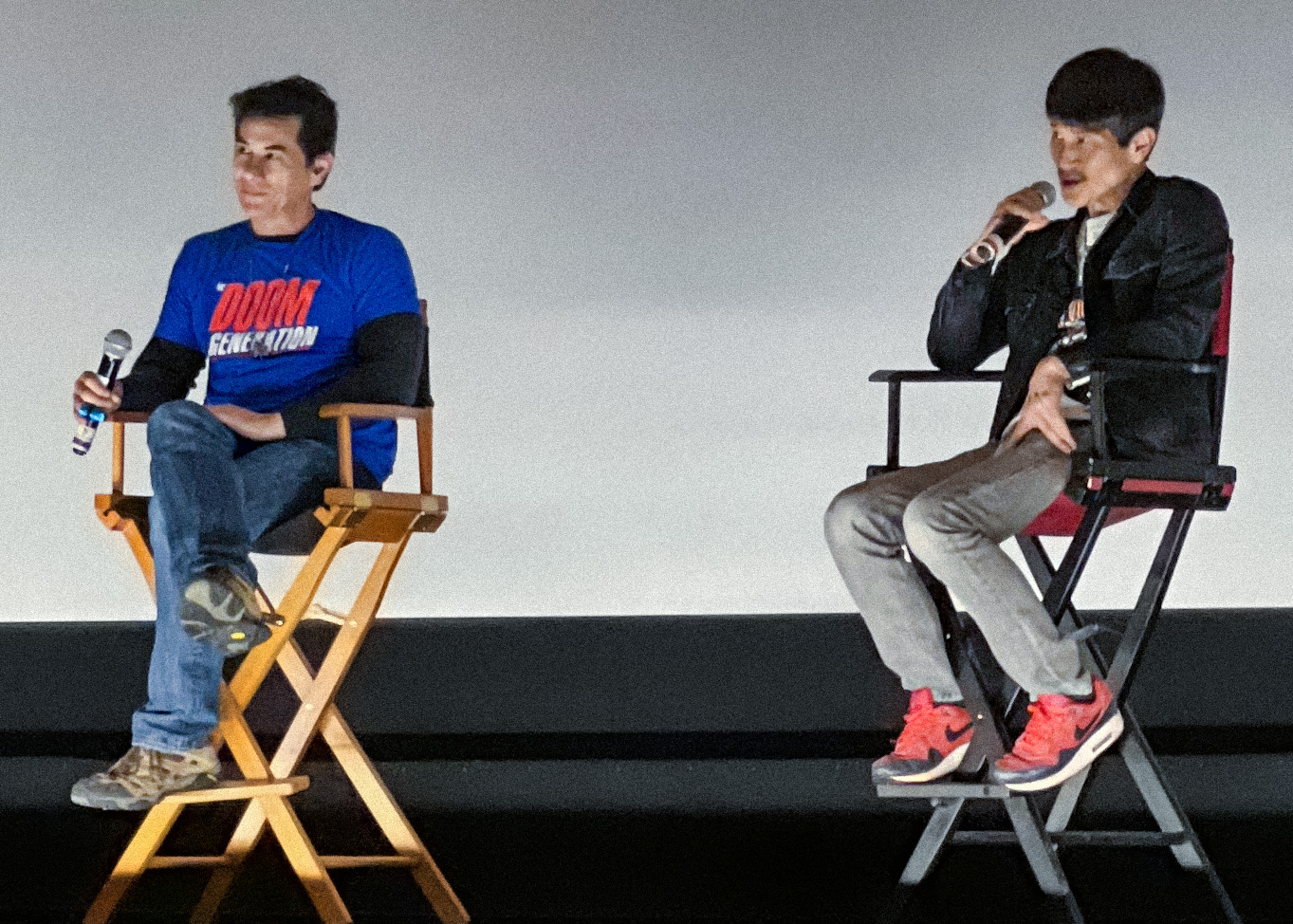
Duval and Araki answering audience questions after an April 2023 screening of The Doom Generation restoration at the New Mission Theater, San Francisco

The first cut as shown at Sundance featured several scenes removed from future releases. It was shown at the 2023 Sundance Film Festival, restored in 4K with 5.1 surround sound, with the restoration supervised by Araki. This version released in cinemas around the US, starting April 6, 2023, at the Brooklyn Academy of Music as part of Newfest's series "Queering the Canon: Totally Radical".

According to Araki, the new 4K restoration of The Doom Generation is the only one that he wants audiences to watch from here on out: "I hope that this new version of it wipes those old copies out entirely, because they're so inferior. There was an R-rated cut of Doom Generation that was made without my approval, and it's terrible. It's literally been butchered beyond recognition, and I'd prefer that people don't watch it at all than watch that copy of it."

This version of the film was released on Blu-ray from Strand Releasing in the fall of 2023. In 2024, the Criterion Collection announced its own release of the director's cut as part of its Gregg Araki's Teen Apocalypse Trilogy set, released on September 24 of that year.

== Reception ==
The Doom Generation received mixed reviews, with critics often comparing the film both favorably and unfavorably to Oliver Stone's Natural Born Killers. It was praised for its style, themes and humor, but criticized for its story, tone, violence and visuals. On the review aggregator website Rotten Tomatoes, 55% of 40 critics' reviews are positive. Metacritic, which uses a weighted average, assigned the film a score of 48 out of 100, based on 20 critics, indicating "mixed or average" reviews.

Giving the film its very first review, in Variety, Emanuel Levy noted: "Stylishly yet personally expressive, 'The Doom Generation' marks an innovative turning point in Araki's career." Roger Ebert rated the film "zero stars" and objected to what he perceived as its cynicism, ironic detachment, and depictions of blasé violence, writing: "Note carefully that I do not object to the content of his movie, but to the attitude. ... Araki may not have been thinking of Leopold and Loeb when he made his movie, but I was when I watched it." Ricky da Conceição of Sound on Sight named the film the best of Araki's "Teenage Apocalypse Trilogy" and said it "represented a major artistic leap forward" for Araki, who "creates a twisted pastiche of science fiction, nihilistic road movie and teen angst filtered with deadpan comedy and his own unique commentary on the depravity of modern America." He praised the set design, lighting, score and actress Rose McGowan, who "steals the show as the foul mouthed, morally aimless femme fatale on crystal meth and Diet Coke."
