= Gregg Araki =

American film director (born 1959)

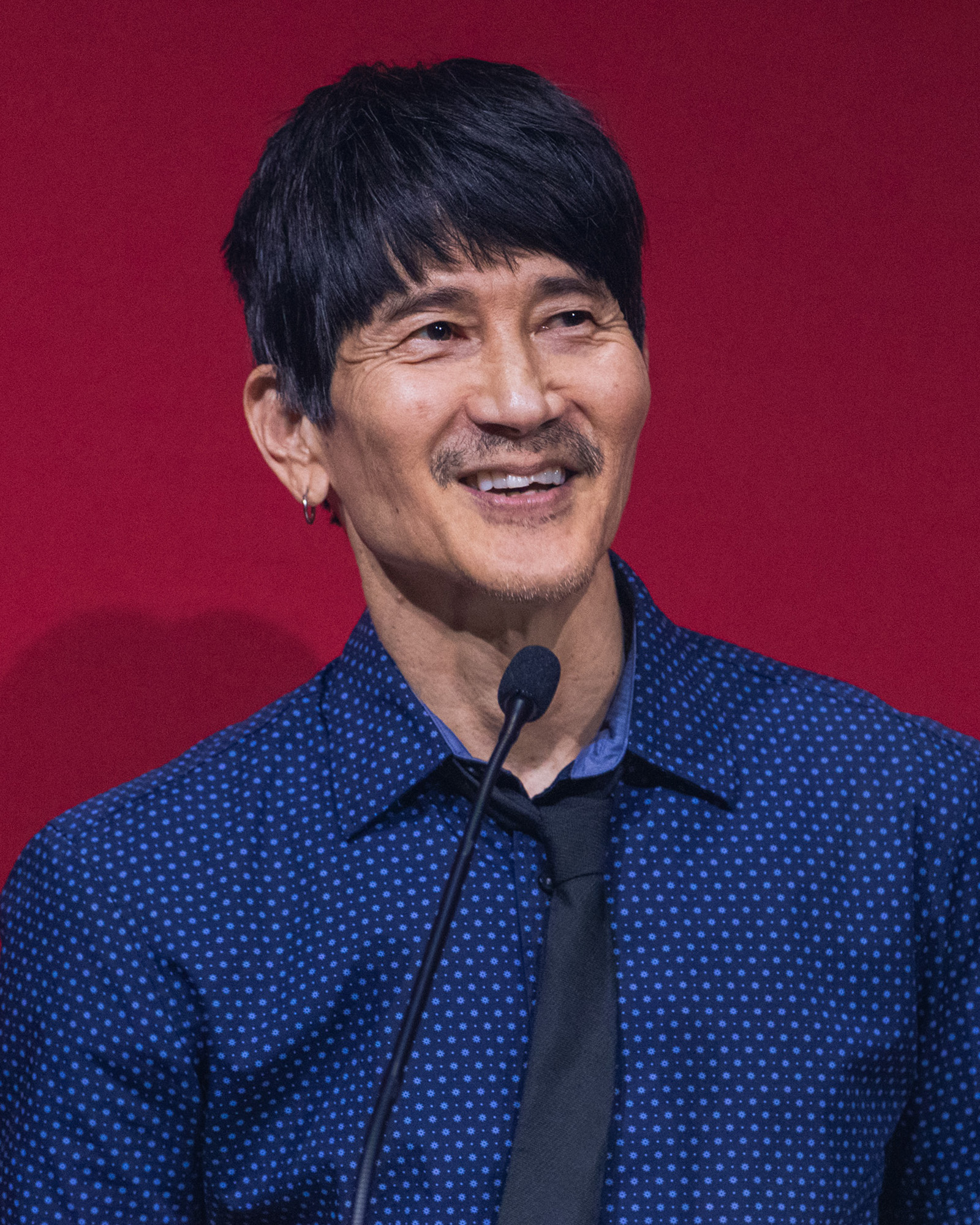
- Araki in 2025
- Born: December 17, 1959 (age 66); Los Angeles, California, U.S.
- Education: University of California, Santa Barbara (BA); University of Southern California (MFA)
- Occupations: Film director; screenwriter; producer
- Years active: 1987–present
- Style: New Queer Cinema

Gregg Araki (born December 17, 1959) is an American filmmaker. He is noted for his involvement with the New Queer Cinema movement. His Teenage Apocalypse film trilogy, consisting of Totally F***ed Up (1993), The Doom Generation (1995) and Nowhere (1997), has been heralded as a cult classic. His film Kaboom (2010) was the inaugural winner of the Queer Palm at the Cannes Film Festival.

== Early life and education ==
Araki was born in Los Angeles on December 17, 1959, to Japanese American parents. He grew up in nearby Santa Barbara, California, and enrolled in college at the University of California, Santa Barbara. He graduated with a B.A. from UCSB in 1982. He later attended the University of Southern California's School of Cinematic Arts, where he graduated with a Master of Fine Arts in 1985.

== Career ==
=== Low-budget beginnings ===
Araki made his directorial debut in 1987 with Three Bewildered People in the Night. With a budget of only $5,000 and using a stationary camera, he told the story of a romance between a video artist, her sweetheart, and her gay friend. Two years later, Araki followed up with The Long Weekend (O' Despair), another film with a $5,000 budget. His third film, The Living End (1992), saw an increase to $25,000. Director Jon Jost lent him camera equipment and provided spare film stock. He often had to shoot his early movies spontaneously and without proper permits.

Despite the financial constraints, Araki's films received critical acclaim. He received awards from the Locarno International Film Festival and the Los Angeles Film Critics Association, with an additional nomination for a Sundance Film Festival award.

=== Teenage Apocalypse trilogy ===
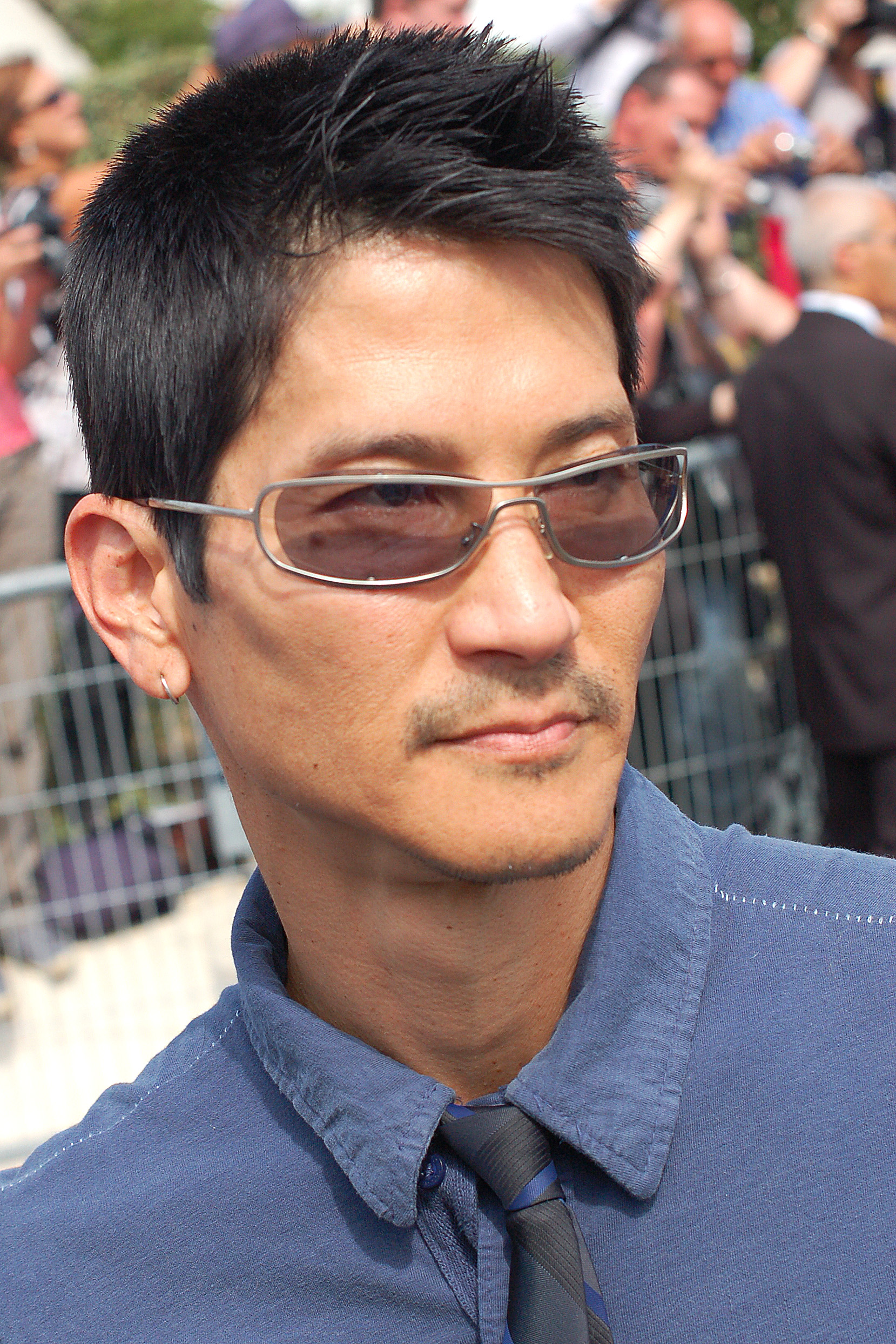
Araki at the Deauville American Film Festival in September 2010

Araki's next three movies—Totally F***ed Up (1993), The Doom Generation (1995), and Nowhere (1997)—were collectively dubbed the Teenage Apocalypse trilogy. The trio has been characterized as "... teen alienation, hazy sexuality and aggression." A former student of his at UC Santa Barbara, Andrea Sperling, co-produced the films with him.

The trilogy saw Araki work increasingly with more notable actors and actresses including Rose McGowan, Margaret Cho, Parker Posey, Guillermo Díaz, Ryan Phillippe, Heather Graham, and Mena Suvari among others.

The trilogy received varying degrees of reviews, from a thumbs down and "zero stars" by Roger Ebert to "Literally the Best Thing Ever" by Rookie, and was eventually heralded as cult classics.

=== Subsequent efforts ===
Araki's film Splendor (1999) was both an homage to screwball comedies of the 1940s and 1950s and a response to the controversy surrounding his ongoing relationship (despite Araki describing himself as "gay") with actress Kathleen Robertson. Hailed as the director's most optimistic film to date, it made its premiere at the 1999 Sundance Film Festival.

Araki's next project was the ill-fated MTV production This Is How the World Ends, originally planned with a budget of $1.5 million. He viewed it as a chance to reach the masses through MTV's viewership and signed on to do the project despite the budget being cut to $700,000. Araki wrote, directed, and shot the pilot episode, but ultimately MTV decided against the project and the effort never aired.

Following a short hiatus, Araki returned in 2004 with the critically acclaimed Mysterious Skin, based on the 1995 Scott Heim novel of the same name. This marked Araki's first work with someone else's source material.

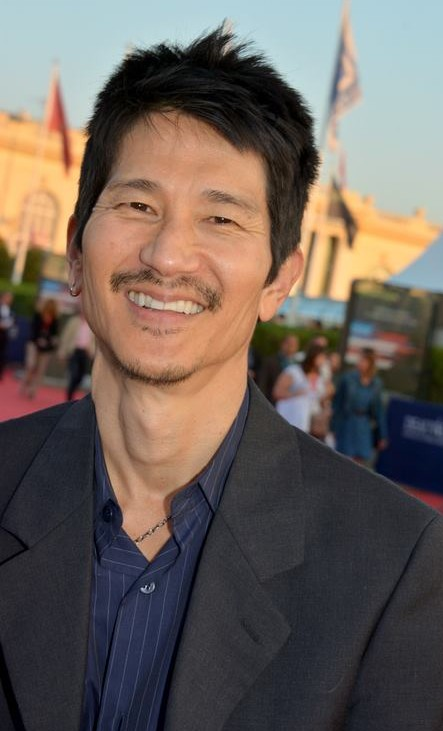
Araki in 2014

Araki's next feature was the stoner comedy Smiley Face (2007), featuring Anna Faris, Adam Brody, and John Krasinski, written by Dylan Haggerty. It marked a stark change from the dark, heavy drama of Mysterious Skin, a change purposely planned by Araki. It received very favorable reviews, with some describing it as another of Araki's potential cult classics.

Kaboom marked Araki's tenth film and made its premiere at the 2010 Cannes Film Festival. It was awarded the first ever Queer Palm for its contribution to lesbian, gay, bisexual, and transgender issues.

Araki followed that film with White Bird in a Blizzard (2014), which was given limited release to mixed reviews. Araki returned to television with the 2019 series Now Apocalypse, co-executive produced by Gregory Jacobs and Steven Soderbergh on Starz.

Araki's next film, the comedy/thriller I Want Your Sex, stars Olivia Wilde, Cooper Hoffman, and Charli XCX. The screenplay was written by Araki and Karley Sciortino. The film premiered at the Sundance Film Festival on January 23, 2026, and was released theatrically in the United States on July 31, 2026.

On September 16, 2026, it was reported by Deadline, that Araki's newest project is a black comedy entitled The Decline of Fucking Western Civilization, had cast Ashton Kutcher and Alison Brie, with Jesse Williams in talks.

=== Style ===
One notable feature of Araki's work is the frequent presence of shoegaze music. This was first seen in the soundtrack of Totally Fucked Up, and was also substantially featured in the films Nowhere and Mysterious Skin. Both The Living End and Nowhere owe their titles to this shoegaze influence: The Living End after The Jesus and Mary Chain song of the same name, and Nowhere after Ride's album Nowhere.

== Awards and honors ==
In 2010, Kaboom was named the first-ever winner of the Cannes Film Festival Queer Palm. Araki has also been honored with the 2006 Filmmaker on the Edge Award at the Provincetown International Film Festival. In 2013, Araki was recognized by the Museum of Arts and Design in New York City with the retrospective God Help Me: Gregg Araki.

== Personal life ==
Araki has previously described himself as "a gay Asian American". However, he had a relationship with actress Kathleen Robertson from 1997 to 1999. In a 2014 interview, at which time he was in a relationship with a male partner, Araki said: "I don't really identify as anything", adding "I'd probably identify as gay at this point, but I have been with women."

== Filmography ==
=== Film ===
Year	Title	Director	Writer	Producer	Editor	Cinematography	Ref.
1987	Three Bewildered People in the Night	Yes	Yes	Yes	Yes	Yes	
1989	The Long Weekend (O' Despair)	Yes	Yes	Yes	Yes	No	
1992	The Living End	Yes	Yes	No	Yes	Yes	
1993	Totally F***ed Up	Yes	Yes	Yes	Yes	Yes	
1995	The Doom Generation	Yes	Yes	Yes	Yes	No	
1997	Nowhere	Yes	Yes	Yes	Yes	No	
1999	Splendor	Yes	Yes	Yes	Yes	No	
2004	Mysterious Skin	Yes	Yes	Yes	Yes	No	
2007	Smiley Face	Yes	No	Yes	Yes	No	
2010	Kaboom	Yes	Yes	Yes	Yes	No	
2014	White Bird in a Blizzard	Yes	Yes	Yes	Yes	No	
2026	I Want Your Sex	Yes	Yes	Yes	Yes	No	
TBA	The Decline of Fucking Western Civilization	Yes	Yes	Yes	Yes	No	

=== Television ===
Year	Title	Notes	Ref.
2000	This Is How the World Ends	Unaired pilot; creator, director, writer, producer, editor	
2016	American Crime	Episode: "Season Two: Episode Three"	
2016	Greenleaf	Episode: "Men Like Trees Walking"	
2016	Red Oaks	2 episodes	
2017–2018	13 Reasons Why	4 episodes	
2018	Riverdale	Episode: "Chapter Twenty-Four: The Wrestler"	
2018	Heathers	2 episodes	
2019	Now Apocalypse	Creator, director, writer, executive producer	
2022	Dahmer – Monster: The Jeffrey Dahmer Story	Episode: "Lionel"	
2022	American Gigolo	Episode: "Nothing Is Real but the Girl"	
