= Bloody Mary (2006 film) =

- Film poster
- Directed by: Richard Valentine
- Written by: Richard Valentine
- Based on: Bloody Mary
- Produced by: T.W. Miller; Kim Tyler
- Starring: Jaason Simmons; Kim Tyler; Matt Borlenghi; Cory Monteith
- Cinematography: Bill Summers
- Edited by: Alex Carrillo; Bill Summers
- Music by: Richard Tyler
- Production companies: KAT Pictures; Sticks & Stones Films; Black Hat Productions
- Distributed by: Echo Bridge Home Entertainment
- Release date: 2006
- Running time: 93 minutes
- Country: United States
- Language: English
- Budget: $70,000 (estimated)

Bloody Mary is a 2006 horror thriller film written and directed by Richard Valentine and starring Jaason Simmons, Kim Tyler, Matt Borlenghi, and Cory Monteith. The film had a negative critical reception.

== Plot ==
The film begins with a group of nurses at a psychiatric hospital daring a fellow nurse, Nicole (Jessica Von), to go into the hospital's basement for a game of Bloody Mary. Playing what the others call "The Mirror Game", she releases the vengeful spirit and is snatched away. When Nicole is reported missing, her writer/reporter sister Natalie (Kim Tyler) decides to investigate on her own.

As the film progresses, more people are killed by the spirit of Bloody Mary (Richard Valentine) in gruesome ways while Natalie uncovers clues about the truth behind her sister's disappearance and Mary herself.

Near the end, almost all of the main characters are dead except for Natalie, who discovers that Bloody Mary is actually her mother.

== Cast ==
- Kim Tyler ... Natalie
- Matthew Borlenghi ... Bobby
- Danni Hamilton ... Jenna
- Troy Turi ... Johnny
- Christian Schrapff ... Scooter
- Amber Borycki ... Tabitha
- Cory Monteith ... Paul
- Richard Carmen ... Dr. McCarty
- Eero Johnson ... Railroad
- Dex Manley ... Luther
- Jason Benson ... Geoff
- Anna Pippus ... Hilary
- Lindsay Marett ... April
- Brianne Wigeland ... Shelby
- Jaason Simmons ... Dr. Daniels
- Jessica Lous ... Nicole
- Sandra Steier ... Voice of Mary / Margaret
- Shane David ... News Reporter

== Reception ==
Critical response to the film was generally negative, with the film receiving heavy criticism of the plot. Steve "Uncle Creepy" Barton of Dread Central rated the film 2/5 stars and said of the film: "there's ... some good acting, killer sound design, spooky ghost effects, and a decent amount of nudity and gore. It's a real shame all that goodness gets lost in a semi-coherent abyss of confusion." Dave Murray of Joblo.com rated the film 1.5/4 stars and said that it was "fun to watch once" but not a film that he could recommend. Christopher Null of Contactmusic.com said, "There are nuggets of what might be something worth watching in all of this, but they come through only faintly and in short bursts."

== See also ==
- Bloody Mary folklore in popular culture
