= MoneyBart =

- The Simpsons episode
- Promotional image for the episode featuring Mike Scioscia
- Episode no.: Season 22; Episode 3
- Directed by: Nancy Kruse
- Written by: Tim Long
- Production code: MABF18
- Original air date: October 10, 2010

Guest appearances
- Mike Scioscia as himself; Bill James as himself

Episode features
- Chalkboard gag: "I must not write all over the walls" (written all over the walls, door, and blackboard)
- Couch gag: Couch gag by Banksy: The Simpsons are seen as a picture on the wall of a sweatshop where Asian workers are seen drawing the couch gag and creating Simpsons merchandise.

Episode chronology
← Previous "Loan-a Lisa"	Next → "Treehouse of Horror XXI"
- The Simpsons season 22

"MoneyBart" (stylized as "MoneyBART") is the third episode of the twenty-second season of the American animated television series The Simpsons. It first aired on the Fox network in the United States on October 10, 2010. In this episode, Lisa coaches Bart's Little League baseball team to a record winning streak by using her book smarts in statistics and probability. However, when Bart questions Lisa's coaching tactics and accuses her of taking the fun out of baseball, Lisa benches him from the championship game.

The episode was written by Tim Long. This was the last episode that Nancy Kruse directed for the series. It features an opening sequence and couch gag written by British graffiti artist and political activist Banksy, who stated he had been "inspired by reports that Simpsons characters are animated in Seoul, South Korea".

The episode was watched in a total of 6.74 million households.

Critical reception was generally favorable, with praises towards the story and jokes but criticism towards the episode's use of baseball-themed celebrity cameos.

== Plot ==
A visit by Dahlia Brinkley, the only Springfield Elementary graduate ever to enter an Ivy League college, gives Lisa a severe inferiority complex because she is involved in very few extracurricular activities. When Ned Flanders resigns as coach of Bart's Little League team, the Springfield Isotots, Lisa seizes the chance to extend her résumé and takes the position. Since she knows nothing about baseball, she seeks advice from the patrons of Moe's Tavern, who direct her to Professor Frink and his scientific colleagues. She learns about sabermetrics from them and uses this science to organize the Isotots' strategy; as a result, their record quickly improves, and they rise in the league standings. However, Bart eventually rebels against her management, saying that she has taken all the fun out of the game, and hits a home run despite her orders to let the pitcher walk him. The Isotots win the game, but Lisa throws Bart off the team for his insubordination.

The dismissal raises tension at the Simpson household, with Homer and Marge siding with Lisa and Bart, respectively. Homer believes that Lisa needs to do what is good for the team, while Marge thinks she should put her relationship with Bart first. Under Lisa's leadership, the team advances to the championship against Capital City. On the day of the game, Marge takes Bart to an amusement park; while they ride the roller coaster, Lisa calls Bart to beg for his help, but he brushes her off. Mike Scioscia, manager of the Los Angeles Angels of Anaheim (and a former ringer for Mr. Burns' softball team), pops up in the seats behind Marge and Bart and tells him that the best players listen to their managers, pointing out his three World Series wins – two as player, one as manager. Marge takes Bart to the game, which is now in its last inning, with the Isotots down 11–10. Bart puts aside his differences with Lisa and offers to pinch-run from first base, then ignores her signs and steals both second and third. As he begins to steal home, Lisa realizes the odds are vastly against him, then decides to ignore the numbers and cheer him on anyway. He is tagged out at the plate, costing the Isotots their championship bid, but Lisa thanks him for helping her learn to love baseball as a game, and the team cheers them for resolving their differences.

== Production ==
The episode was written by Tim Long, his second writing credit of the season after "Elementary School Musical", and was directed by Nancy Kruse, her first directing credit of the season, and her last of the series. This marks the second appearance of Mike Scioscia on The Simpsons. His first appearance on the show was in the season 3 episode "Homer at the Bat" in 1992, which is referenced in the episode. Baseball sabermetrician Bill James also makes a guest appearance in a talking picture on a wiki, being used as a reference when Professor Frink points out to Lisa that "baseball is a game played by the dextrous but only understood by the poindextrous."

=== Opening sequence ===
Approximately the first half-minute of the opening sequence remains the same, with a few oddities: the word "Banksy" is sprayed onto a number of walls and other public spaces; Krusty's billboard advertises that he now performs at funerals (first seen on "Take My Life, Please", but this had "Banksy" on it). The chalkboard gag ("I must not write all over the walls") is written all over the classroom walls, clock, door, and floor.

After the Simpsons arrive at home, the camera cuts to a shot of them on the couch, then zooms out to show this as a picture hanging on the wall of a fictional overseas Asian animation and merchandise sweatshop. The animation color quickly becomes drab and gray, and the music turns dramatic à la Schindler's List. A large group of tired and sickly artists draw animation cels for The Simpsons among piles of human bones and toxic waste, and a female artist hands a barefoot child employee an animation cel, which he washes in a vat of biohazardous fluid.

The camera tracks down to a lower floor of the building, where small kittens are thrown into a woodchipper-type machine to provide the filling for Bart Simpson plush dolls. The toys are then placed into a cart pulled by a sad panda which is driven by a man with a whip. A man shipping boxes with The Simpsons logo on the side uses the tongue from a severed dolphin head to fasten shut the packages. Another employee uses the horn of a sickly unicorn to smash the holes in the center of The Simpsons DVDs. The shot zooms out to reveal that the sweatshop is contained within a grim version of the 20th Century Fox logo, surrounded by barbed wire, searchlights, and a watchtower.

==== Creation ====
British graffiti artist and political activist Banksy is credited with creating the opening titles and couch gag for this episode, in what amounted to the first time that an artist has been invited to storyboard the show. Executive producer Al Jean first took note of Banksy after seeing his 2010 film Exit Through the Gift Shop. According to Jean, "The concept in my mind was, 'What if this graffiti artist came in and tagged our main titles?'" Simpsons casting director Bonnie Pietila was able to contact the artist through the film's producers, and asked if he would be interested in writing a main title for the show. Jean said Banksy "sent back boards for pretty much what you saw." Series creator Matt Groening gave the idea his blessing, and helped try to make the sequence as close to Banksy's original storyboards as possible. Fox's standards and practices department demanded some changes, and Jean agreed to them "for taste"; Jean said that "95 percent of it is just the way he [Banksy] wanted," but declined to say what was in the censored 5%, only saying that the original version was "even a little sadder." In January 2011, Banksy published the original storyboard on his website. It appears that a poster of Rupert Murdoch could be the 5% that was left out of the final cut.

The Simpsons is storyboarded at Film Roman, a company based in California. The storyboards, voice tracks and coloring instructions are then sent to AKOM, a company in Seoul, South Korea. According to Nelson Shin, the founder of AKOM, they received the storyboard for the sequence in August 2010. Believing the sequence to be "excessive and offending" he pushed for some of the darker jokes to be removed. He was successful, though "not nearly as much as he had pushed for." For example, in the storyboards, the workers were wearing conical Asian hats, but these were removed.

Banksy told The Guardian that his opening sequence was influenced by The Simpsons long-running use of animation studios in Seoul, South Korea. The newspaper also reported that the creation of the sequence "is said to have been one of the most closely guarded secrets in US television – comparable to the concealment of Banksy's own identity."

BBC News reported that "According to [Banksy], his storyboard led to delays, disputes over broadcast standards and a threatened walk out by the animation department." However, Al Jean disputed this, saying "[The animation department] didn't walk out. Obviously they didn't. We've depicted the conditions in a fanciful light before." Commenting on hiring Banksy to create the titles, Jean joked, "This is what you get when you outsource." Although conceding to the fact that The Simpsons is largely animated in South Korea, Jean went on to state that the scenes shown in titles are "very fanciful, far-fetched. None of the things he depicts are true. That statement should be self-evident, but I will emphatically state it."

== Cultural references ==
The title is a play on Michael M. Lewis's 2003 book Moneyball, which examines the 2002 Oakland Athletics' use of sabermetrics to build a competitive baseball team; the book would be made into an Oscar nominated film in 2011, the year after this episode aired. Moe laments his decision to advertise his drink specials in Scientific American magazine, which led to Frink and company coming in.

Homer references the 1969 Mets outfielder Ron Swoboda, as well as the collision between Pete Rose and Ray Fosse in the 1970 All-Star Game. When Flanders tells Bart that he is resigning from the little league team, he says to "call him Walter Matthau, but I'm a bad news bearer." This is a reference to the baseball themed film, The Bad News Bears (which Matthau starred in). When Maggie defeats Lisa in fencing, she carves a letter M into Lisa's chest pad, a reference to Zorro.

== Reception ==
In its original American broadcast on October 10, 2010, "MoneyBart" was viewed by an estimated 6.72 million viewers, according to the Nielsen Media Research, receiving a 3.0 rating/8 share among adults between the ages of 18 and 49, beating The Cleveland Show and American Dad! in the demographic and total viewers and ranking third in its time slot. The episode received a 29% drop in the demographic from the previous episode, "Loan-a Lisa".

The episode received favorable reviews.

Brad Trechak of the TV Squad said of the episode: "In the end, the episode was really good at the beginning and the ending, but the middle kind of dragged."

Eric Hochburger of TV Fanatic criticized the Mike Scioscia cameo, although he said that "[w]hile this week's installment will never replace our favorite Simpsons baseball episode, "Homer at the Bat," there [was] certainly plenty of great jokes and a strong enough story with heart to keep us entertained."

Rowan Kaiser of The A.V. Club compared the episode favorably to "Lisa on Ice" although she also criticized the Scioscia cameo, calling it "awkward". She gave the episode an A−.

=== Opening sequence ===
The opening sequence received a generally mixed response.

Nelson Shin, the founder of AKOM, the Korean company that animates The Simpsons, said that he and his staff did protest being asked to animate the sequence. Shin said that the sequence suggests that animators work in sweatshops, but they actually work in "high-tech workshops". He added, "Most of the content was about degrading people from Korea, China, Mexico and Vietnam. If Banksy wants to criticize these things ... I suggest that he learn more about it first."

Colby Hall of Mediaite called the sequence "a jaw-dropping critique of global corporate licensing, worker exploitation and over-the-top dreariness of how western media companies (in this case, 20th Century Fox) takes advantage of outsourced labor in developing countries."

Melissa Bell of The Washington Post felt Banksy's titles had helped revive The Simpsons' "edge", but after "the jarring opening, the show went back to its regular routine of guest cameos, self-referential jokes and tangential story lines."

Marlow Riley of MTV wrote, "as satire, [the opening is] a bit over-the-top. What is shocking is that Fox ran Banksy's ballsy critique of outsourcing, The Simpsons, and the standards and human rights conditions that people in first world nations accept. It's uncomfortable and dark, and not what's expected from the modern Simpsons, which mainly consists of 'Homer hurts himself' jokes."

== See also ==
- List of works by Banksy
