= Paul Preiss =

American actor

- Born: June 9, 1980 (age 45); Port Huron, Michigan, United States
- Occupation(s): Actor, model, director, producer
- Years active: 2005–present
- Height: 1.85 m (6 ft 1 in)

Paul Preiss (born June 9, 1980, in Port Huron, Michigan) is an American actor, model, director and producer.

After graduating from college, Paul Preiss moved to New York City and worked as a model for three years in USA and Europe. He was signed to IMG Models agency.

Moving to Los Angeles, he aspired for an acting career and ended up playing lead role in three feature films, most notably in lead roles as Nate Merritt in Damion Dietz's 2008 film Dog Tags and Ryan in The Legend of Bloody Mary. He resides in Venice, California.

Preiss has also directed advertisements for Levi's and Nike.

== Biography ==
Originally from Port Huron, Michigan, Paul headed to NYC after graduating from college. He was immediately signed as a model with the acclaimed modeling agency, IMG. He worked as a model in NYC and Europe for three years before discovering his love and passion for acting.

Never shying away from a road trip, Paul packed his bags and drove across the country to pursue his dreams in Los Angeles. Within his first year in Hollywood, Paul has played the lead in three feature films. He just wrapped production on the independent feature Dog Tags playing a troubled marine on a path to find the father he never knew.

Paul resides in Venice, CA with his black lab "Sunny".

== Filmography ==
Year	Title	Role	Note
2008	Dog Tags	Nate Merritt	—
2008	The Legend of Bloody Mary	Ryan	—
2010	Cyrus	Katz	—
2010	Freckle and Bean	Gavin	web-series
2011	Beneath	Justin	short film
