= Dog tag (disambiguation) =

A dog tag is the informal name for the identification tags worn by military personnel, so named as it bears resemblance to pet tags.

Dog tag may also refer to:

- Pet tag, a small flat tag worn on pets' collars or harnesses
- Dog Tags (film), a 2008 film by Damion Dietz
- Digital on-screen graphic, known as DOG tags
- Medical identification tag, a dog tag, bracelet, or other jewelry worn to provide medical information in an emergency
