= The Legend of Bloody Mary =

- Her vision... will be your last, I Believe in Mary Worth
- Directed by: John Stecenko
- Written by: Dominick R. Domingo; John Stecenko
- Produced by: Robert Ahrens; Robert J. Locke; Grant Sawyer; John Stecenko
- Starring: Paul Preiss; Nicole Aiken; Caitlin Wachs
- Cinematography: John Stecenko; Joe Hendrick
- Edited by: Ricky Hayner
- Music by: Steven Keifer
- Production companies: MK4 Productions; Vision One Pictures
- Distributed by: Lions Gate Films; Grindstone Entertainment Group
- Release date: September 16, 2008
- Running time: 93 minutes
- Country: United States
- Language: English
- Budget: $1,000,000

The Legend of Bloody Mary is a 2008 American horror-thriller film written by John Stecenko and Dominick R. Domingo, directed by Stecenko and starring Paul Preiss, Nicole Aiken and Caitlin Wachs. The film has an R rating for its violence, language and sexuality/nudity.

== Plot ==
Ryan (played by Paul Preiss) has been plagued by nightmares since his sister Amy (Rachel Taylor) disappeared after playing the game "Bloody Mary" eight years earlier. Ryan, now a senior at college, suffers from stress and guilt from his sister's disappearance. His girlfriend Rachel (Irina Costa) calls for the help of Father O'Neal (Robert J. Locke), a former professor of Ryan. O'Neal, a priest and an archaeologist, tries to help Ryan by attempting to uncover the circumstances on Amy's vanishing.

== Cast ==
- Paul Preiss as Ryan
- Nicole Aiken as Nicole
- Caitlin Wachs as Mary Worth
- Robert J. Locke as Father O'Neal
- Brittany Miller as Jenny
- Rachel Taylor as Amy
- Irina Costa as Rachelle
- Stephen Macht as Magistrate
- Cooper Campbell as Claire
- Joseph Domingo as Detective Romano
- Elissa Dowling as Mary Winters
- Dean O'Gorman as Reverend Whittaker
- Chris Blasman as Rev. Samuel Blake
- Kristen Dalto as Maggie
- Joseph Battaglia as Young Ryan
- Lauren Phillips as Ashley
- Joe Hendrick as Roommate
- Randy Mulkey as Governor Holbrook
- Matt Huhn as Governor's Assistant
- Sandi Tucker as Girlfriend (credited as Sandra Tucker)
- Mike Nelson as Construction Worker
- Jackie Kreisler as Mary Worth Corpse
- Gabriella Lamb as Maggie's Mother
- Frank Iatarola as Teacher
- LeLand Washington as Robertson

== Critical reception ==
The film has received negative reviews. Tom Becker of the DVD Verdict said, "The film is guilty of being a bloody bore. The accused are sentenced to stand in front of a mirror chanting, "I believe in Ed Wood," until they learn that bad movies can be entertaining, too". Eat Horror panned the film stating, "This is a muddled story with plot holes aplenty and terrible acting even by low budget horror standards. The direction is all over the place with too many hand-held shots and the meager effects are cheap and terrible. You would think the Bloody Mary story would eventually spawn a decent horror film but this isn't it". Home Theater Info rated B+ giving 7 out of 10.

== See also ==
- Bloody Mary folklore in popular culture
