= Dog Tags (film) =

2008 film by Damion Dietz

- Directed by: Damion Dietz
- Written by: Damion Dietz
- Produced by: Damion Dietz, Stephanie Kirchen
- Starring: Paul Preiss; Bart Fletcher
- Cinematography: Terence Pratt
- Edited by: Denise Howard
- Music by: Jeffery Alan Jones
- Release date: April 10, 2008
- Country: United States
- Language: English

Dog Tags is a 2008 American film written and directed by Damion Dietz and starring Paul Preiss and Bart Fletcher.

== Synopsis ==
The film is the coming of age story of Nate Merritt, who stuck in bad relationships with his fiancée and mother decides to enlist in the military, although he is not sure. In the midst of all this turmoil in his life, he meets Andy Forte, a carefree gay man, and the two immediately strike a chord and become soul mates trying to help each other through their dilemmas and troubled youths.

Both men have domineering mothers and live in broken families. Nate's mother Deb is a single mother who hides the real identity of the father Gene from her son, although the alcoholic Gene still continues to live a destitute life in the vicinity in a one-room shack surviving on permanent disability cheques and doing odd jobs on the side. Andy's divorced mother Louise is a former actress that had to leave everything behind to take care of Andy and Andy's son Travis blaming her son for her own predicament of a stay-home caretaker considering Andy an almost absent irresponsible father.

Nate has to deal with Trish Huddle a philandering fiancée, who is anxious to conceive a son from any military man, almost guiding Nate step by step in the mechanics of a sexual ritual to achieve this. She has no qualms to have intercourse in Nate's own residence during his absence with other married military men to achieve having the desired boy as Nate discovers when he calls in home unexpectedly. Meanwhile, Nate wants desperately to find his real father, despite grave objections from his mother. He is led to think his father is a married military man called Mark Dessau, who had a long-term relationship with Deb, Nate's mother. Meanwhile, Andy is fighting his own demons and is constantly haunted by the memories of his first lover, a Marine. Andy is unable to get over the loss of his first love and fails in all his other intimate relationships, despite the fact his relation with the Marine, though intense, never had any chance of survival with the Marine just abandoning him to his misery. When a new man tries to become intimate with him during a disastrous get-together scene, Andy confesses his incurable love to the Marine and refuses to go further, which prompts the man to tell him frankly: "once a marine, always a marine". Andy is confused by his aspirations to build a future away from home, his sexual orientation and his responsibilities as a father.

After meeting Nate, during a very bizarre circumstance at the residence of an amateur porn director "Uncle Sam", who invites them to his house to shoot a pornographic scene for money, Nate and Andy leave the house horrified. When Nate offers Andy help with starting his decrepit car, the two strike an immediate friendship with Andy clearly seeing in Nate a reflection of the Marine he once loved. After learning about Nate's obsession to find his true father, the two journey together on a quest to find him. They also find each other and discover how to confront their true "callings." The two engage to explore their own past, present and future amidst brief flashbacks they see throughout the movie.

The bond strengthens between Nate and Andy including sexual affinity between the two, awakening Nate to his own sexuality. Nate decides to confront Mark Dessau, his supposed "father", but discovers this was just his mothers cover story. It turns out Mark went out with Nate's mother only after Nate had been conceived. This puts Nate into further despair as he realizes that his mother always deceived him. In his moment of vulnerability, his resistance is down and he easy gives in to having sex with Andy. The scene uses a montage effect where Nate is replaced by Andy's first Marine-love who went away, as Andy responds to both the real man and the man in his memory. The next morning Nate is confused but not weirded out. "There is no should or supposed to", Andy says, "What does Nate want to do?"

Confronted by Nate for a last time and upon an ultimatum to his mother that he will quit his prospective military career, Deb finally reveals that Gene is the real father. In Gene's shack, Nate's search is culminated with he finding a childhood photograph of himself in an album kept by Gene, with Nate being the result of a sexual relation between Gene and Deb at a drive-in movie. The film ends at the drive-in itself with Nate searching his soul with what he has to do with his own life. It is clear he chooses the military path, despite desire and futile efforts of Andy who tries to convince Nate that the two live together as partners and to take care of Andy's kid Travis. The departure shots in which Andy reluctantly leaves Nate alone to decide for his destiny, is a repetition, and a deja-vu of his earlier experience with his first-Marine love, exactly as the party friend had told Andy at the beginning of the film, "once a marine, always a marine."

== Cast ==
- Paul Preiss as Nate Merritt
- Bart Fletcher as Andy Forte
- Candy Clark as Deb Merritt, Nate's Mother
- Diane Davisson as Louise Forte, Andy's Mother
- Amy Lindsay as Trish Huddle, Nate's Girlfriend
- Hoyt Richards as Gene, Nate's Natural Father
- Chris Carlisle as Chris
- Keythe Farley as Mark Dessau
- Barry J. Ratcliffe as Uncle Sam
- Grant Harvey as Bapps
- Tanner Max Eflinger as Party Guest #1
- Bobby Zelsdorf as Party Guest #2
- John Koons as Party Guest #3
- Willam Belli as Alan
- Jason Sechrest as Alan's Friend
- Stephen D. Gill as Justin
- Matthew Herrmann as Boy At Bar
- Josh Payne as Pool Boy #1
- Daniel Wilcox as Pool Boy #2
- Marcus Morales as Travis
- Robert S. Martin III as Recruiter (credited as Bobby Trey)
- Justin Mortelliti as The Marine
- Merideth McClean as The Receptionist

== Background ==
Asked about how and why he wrote the story, he said in an interview with Time Out Australia: "I was having a conversation with a marine and we were very, very different people and I learnt a little bit about him, his history and background and so this movie was inspired by his story."

The Village Voice noted that "in 'Dog Tags', Dietz gets serious and is all the better for it... he has freed himself as a writer".
