= Cory Monteith =

Canadian actor (1982–2013)

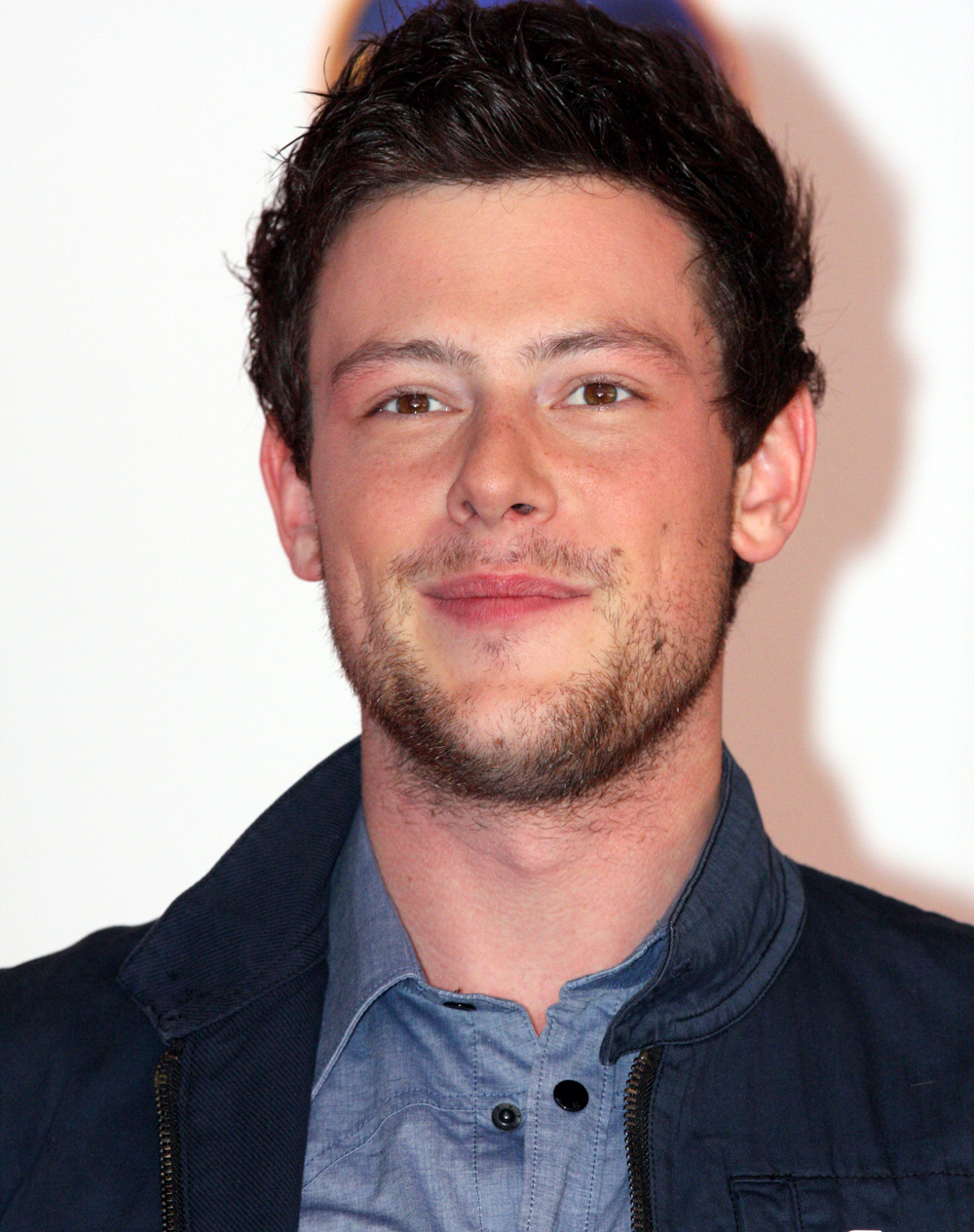
- Monteith in 2011
- Born: Cory Allan Michael Monteith; May 11, 1982; Calgary, Alberta, Canada
- Died: July 13, 2013 (aged 31); Vancouver, British Columbia, Canada
- Occupations: Actor; musician
- Years active: 2004–2013

Cory Allan Michael Monteith (/mɒnˈtiːθ/ mon-TEETH; May 11, 1982 – July 13, 2013) was a Canadian actor and musician. He made his acting debut in the television series Stargate Atlantis (2004), and had other roles in shows including Smallville (2005), and Supernatural (2005). During his career, he starred in over eighteen dramas and seventeen films, with Monte Carlo (2011), Final Destination 3 (2006), and Sisters & Brothers (2011), all becoming commercially successful.

Monteith is best known for his portrayal of Finn Hudson in the first four seasons of the Fox television series Glee. For his portrayal, he won a Screen Actors Guild Award and Teen Choice Award.

Monteith had a troubled adolescence with substance abuse from age 13, and entered drug rehabilitation at age 19. In a 2011 interview with Parade magazine, he discussed his history of substance abuse as a teen, and in March 2013, again sought treatment for his addiction. On July 13, 2013, he died from an overdose of heroin and alcohol in a Vancouver hotel room.

== Early life ==
Monteith was born in Calgary, Alberta, on May 11, 1982, to Ann McGregor, an interior decorator, and Joe Monteith, a soldier who served in the Princess Patricia's Canadian Light Infantry. He had an older brother named Shaun. Monteith's parents divorced when he was seven years old, and he and his older brother were raised by their mother in Victoria, British Columbia. After the divorce, he saw little of his father due to military service, and he had social difficulties at school. From age 13, he used alcohol and marijuana and also started playing truant from school.

After attending 16 schools, including alternative programs for troubled teens, Monteith dropped out altogether at age 16. By that time, his drug and alcohol dependency had increased and he turned to petty crimes, such as stealing money from friends and family, to fund his addictions. His mother and a group of friends staged an intervention when he was 19, and he began attending a rehabilitation program. Monteith stated, "I'm lucky on so many counts. I'm lucky to be alive." He eventually received his high school diploma in 2011 from an alternative school he attended in his youth in Victoria.

Before breaking into show business, Monteith worked various jobs, including Walmart Canada people greeter, taxicab driver, mechanic, school bus driver, roofer, and a band drummer.

== Career ==
=== 2004–2008: Career beginnings ===
Monteith began his acting career in Vancouver, British Columbia. He had minor roles in Final Destination 3, Whisper, and Deck the Halls. He had a recurring role in Kyle XY. He also made guest appearances in television serials such as Smallville, Supernatural, Flash Gordon, Stargate Atlantis, and Stargate SG-1. In 2005, he appeared in Killer Bash, about a tormented geek's soul that was taking revenge on his murderer's children by taking over a girl's twin body. The following year, he made a brief appearance in Bloody Mary, cast as Paul. After Maureen Webb suggested Cory take acting classes, Monteith started acting classes with Anthony Meindl. In 2007, he starred in the MTV series Kaya as Gunnar.

=== 2009–2013: Glee, Bonnie Dune, and film roles ===
In 2009, Monteith was cast as Finn Hudson in the Fox musical comedy- drama series Glee. When Glee was being cast, Monteith's agent, Elena Kirschner, submitted a video of him drumming with some pencils and Tupperware containers. Series creator Ryan Murphy took notice of the video, but pointed out that he had to be singing, as auditioning actors for Glee with no theatrical experience were required to prove they could sing and dance as well as act. Monteith submitted a second, musical tape, in which he sang, in his own words, "a cheesy '80s music video-style version" of REO Speedwagon's "Can't Fight This Feeling". He then attended a mass audition in Los Angeles; his vocal skills were considered weak, but he later performed very well with one of Glee's casting directors, who said that his audition captured Finn's most elusive quality: his "naive, but not stupid, sweetness." Monteith said of his casting process, "I was like a lot of kids, looking for something to be interested in. Something to be passionate about. All you need is permission. Not only for Glee, but for anything in life."

Finn is the star quarterback of his high school football team, and risks alienation from his friends by joining the school's glee club. He is a popular jock at the top of the school's social hierarchy, but when forced to join the glee club, he finds he loves it. His story lines have seen him struggle with his decision to stay in the club, which is at the bottom of the social ladder, while he maintains his popular reputation and the respect of the other jocks. The character must deal with his attraction to both head cheerleader Quinn Fabray (Dianna Agron) and glee club star singer Rachel Berry (Lea Michele) and his storylines increasingly focus on his relationship with them both.

Monteith felt that Finn had to "grow up a lot" during his time on the show. He said, "Finn started off as the stereotypical dumb jock but as the show has gone on, Finn's not dumb anymore, really, he's just a little naïve". Early reviews of Finn from television critics were mixed; Emily St. James of The A.V. Club said that he and Michele were "both agreeable and a little desperate for an outlet" in the pilot episode. Commenting on the fifth episode of the first season, Eric Goldman of IGN wrote, "We got to see a bit of a darker side to Finn... it's good to see this, because up until now, Finn's been a bit too straight-laced to totally invest in." In the second season's eighth episode, "Furt," Tim Stack of Entertainment Weekly noted "It's been a while since we've gotten some Finn focus, and I think I just missed Cory Monteith. But I also forgot what a good, natural actor he can be." Monteith as Finn won the 2011 Teen Choice Award for Choice TV: Actor Comedy, the same category he had been nominated for in 2010. Although he was not a singer before being cast as Finn, Monteith sang lead or joint lead on a large number of songs on the show.

Sometime in 2010, Monteith quietly joined the Canadian indie rock band, Bonnie Dune. He'd met the band's lead singer, Justin Wilczynski on the set of MTV's short-lived show Kaya on which they both performed music together. Monteith served as the band's drummer and back-up vocalist and contributed to their songwriting. The group was writing songs and preparing for their debut album release up until the time of Monteith's death. Their debut performance in the U.S. was held at the Roxy Theater in Los Angeles, on January 9, 2011. Monteith performed with the band at several nightclubs and festivals across the U.S. to promote their music and garner interest. The band's debut single 'Maybe Tonight' is one of six tracks Monteith actively performed on and helped produce and is included on the EP, Miramar, released on February 4, 2014.

In May 2010, the cast of Glee went on a two-week live tour with stops in Los Angeles, Phoenix, Chicago, and New York City. The cast performed hits from the show and several skits between songs. The following May, the cast went on a second tour with mostly new songs and all-new skits, performing for four weeks in the U.S. and Canada, and 11 days in England and Ireland.

In April 2010, Monteith was cast in the romantic comedy movie Monte Carlo. In December 2010, it was announced that Monteith would be starring in and co-producing a new untitled workplace-caper comedy for Fox 2000. On August 8, 2010, he co-hosted the Teen Choice Awards. Monteith hosted the Gemini Awards in Toronto on November 13, 2010.

In January 2011, Monteith shot the film Sisters & Brothers with Dustin Milligan, which premiered at the Toronto International Film Festival on September 11. Canadian director Gia Milani's film All The Wrong Reasons stars Monteith as "a big box department store manager whose wife is struggling with post-traumatic stress disorder." Milani suggests he was excited to play his own age in a "heavy role." He filmed his part on weekdays, flying to Los Angeles on weekends to do promotional work for Glee. In 2011, Monteith filmed a PSA for Straight But Not Narrow, an online PSA organization aimed at changing the minds of young straight people in their attitude and viewpoint towards the LGBT community. In 2012, he hosted the 23rd GLAAD Media Awards in New York City with co-star Naya Rivera.

On July 20, 2013, Ryan Murphy stated in various media outlets that Monteith was set to have a tribute in the third episode of season five, which also dealt with the death of his character Finn Hudson. Monteith's final two films, All the Wrong Reasons and McCanick, premiered posthumously at the 2013 Toronto International Film Festival.

== Personal life ==
=== Relationships ===
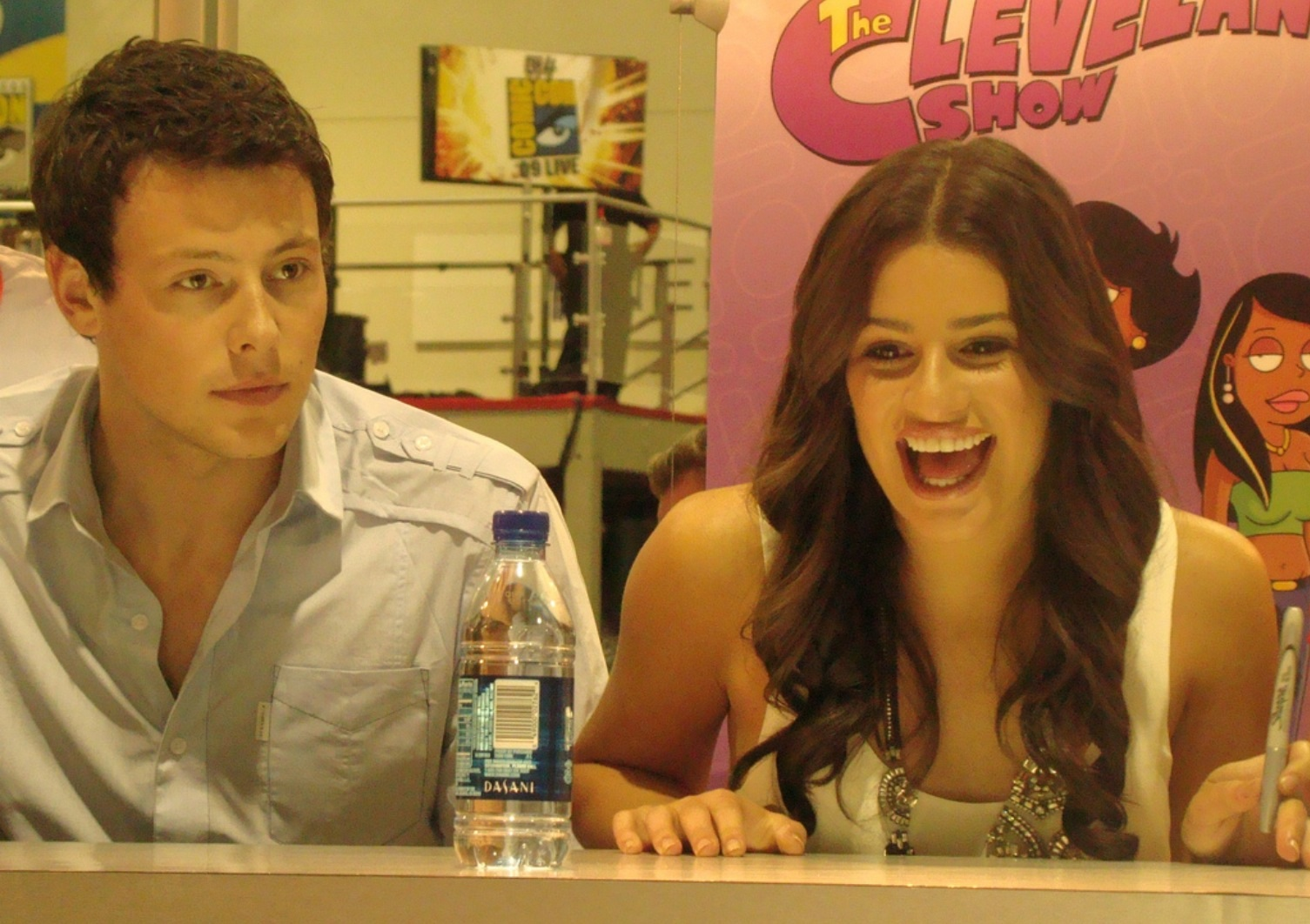
Cory Monteith (pictured left) and Lea Michele (pictured right) at Comic Con in San Diego, 2009.

Monteith began working with American actress Lea Michele in 2008 when they were cast as love interests on Glee. In early 2012, the media reported that they had begun dating. They remained together until his death a year and a half later. In December 2013, a few months after Monteith's death, Michele stated that he was a very private person. Michele has released a number of songs about Monteith since his death. These include "If You Say So", which Michele began writing a week after his death and references the last words he said to her, and "Hey You", a follow-up to "If You Say So", released in April 2017.

=== Substance use ===
On March 31, 2013, Monteith's publicist announced that Monteith had admitted himself into a treatment facility for substance addiction. He had previously received substance abuse treatment when he was 19, following a history of drug use that began around the age of 13. According to Glee co-creator Ryan Murphy, Monteith's admission to rehab in March resulted from an emergency intervention on the Paramount lot, in which Murphy and other members of the Glee cast and crew urged Monteith to accompany doctors to a rehab facility that had been arranged by the show. Monteith agreed, and was consequently written out of the final two episodes of Glee's fourth season after being assured that he would still have his job upon his return. On April 26, 2013, it was reported that Monteith had completed his treatment. At the time of his death, Monteith was living in Los Angeles, where Glee was filmed.

=== Philanthropy ===
Monteith was involved in a charitable organization called Project Limelight, a nonprofit performing arts group for children in the Vancouver Downtown Eastside area. He was an ambassador for Virgin Unite, which changes how businesses and governments run and interact, and unites people and entrepreneurship to improve people's lives. He was also involved in Chrysalis, which helps homeless people and those living in low-income households maintain employment.

Monteith was a strong supporter of LGBT rights and contributed to different organizations of its kind, including the youth-support organization The Trevor Project. Monteith furthermore collaborated with the organization Straight But Not Narrow to promote respect and encouragement from young straight people to their gay counterparts.

== Death, funeral and commemorations ==
On July 13, 2013, Monteith was found dead in his room at the Fairmont Pacific Rim hotel in Vancouver. He was 31 years old. Monteith was scheduled to check out that day following a seven-night stay, but when he failed to do so, hotel staff entered his room around noon and found his body. The Vancouver Police Department stated that the cause of death was not immediately apparent, but ruled out foul play. An autopsy was completed by the British Columbia Coroners Service on July 15. The preliminary autopsy report stated that Monteith died from "a mixed drug toxicity" consisting of heroin and alcohol and that his death appeared to have been accidental. The final report, released by the British Columbia Coroners Service on October 2, 2013, confirmed these findings. It noted that Monteith also had codeine and morphine in his system at the time of his death, and that he was found with drug paraphernalia that included a spoon with drug residue and a used hypodermic needle, as well as two empty bottles of champagne. The coroner wrote that Monteith had experienced intermittent periods of drug abuse and abstinence throughout his life, and that "after a period of cessation from opioid drug use, a previously tolerated drug concentration level may become toxic and fatal." His stay in rehab only months before his death and his attempt to stay off drugs resulted in his lowered tolerance to the drug.

Monteith's body was cremated in Vancouver on July 17, following a private viewing by his immediate family and partner Lea Michele. On July 25, Michele and Glee creator Ryan Murphy held a celebration of life for Monteith in Los Angeles, attended by cast, crew, and creators of the show, as well as colleagues from the show's network and studio. After consultation with Michele, who also played Monteith's love interest on Glee, showrunners postponed production of Glee's fifth season to August rather than late July. Consequently, the season premiered a week later than planned. The season's third episode, "The Quarterback", aired on October 10, 2013, and served as a tribute to Monteith, focusing on the death of his character Finn Hudson; the nature of Hudson's death is never revealed. The show then began a brief hiatus, which lasted until November 7, 2013, due to the extra time that was needed to decide how to proceed with the show following the death. After "The Quarterback" aired, Murphy noted that he had decided to "keep mentioning Finn...We don't just say this is done and we're never going to go back to it, so that resonates throughout the year."

The 65th Primetime Emmy Awards, held on September 22, 2013, featured an extended tribute to Monteith by his Glee co-star Jane Lynch, along with four other actors who died in 2013. He was also featured in the "In Memoriam" segment of the 56th Grammy Awards.

Shortly after his death, Glee fans raised money to "name a star" for Monteith after being inspired by a scene featuring his character on Glee. On July 8, 2020, Naya Rivera, Monteith's Glee co-star and close friend, died in an accidental drowning, and her body was found on July 13, seven years to the date of Monteith's death.

== Filmography ==
=== Film ===
Year	Title	Roles	Notes	Refs
2005	Killer Bash	Douglas Waylan Hart		
2006	Bloody Mary	Paul Zuckerman		
2006	Kraken: Tentacles of the Deep	Michael		
2006	Deck the Halls	Madison's date		
2006	Final Destination 3	Kahill		
2007	Hybrid	Aaron Scates	TV film	
2007	White Noise: The Light	Scooter guy		
2007	Gone	Davis Calder	Short film	
2007	The Invisible	Jimmy		
2007	Whisper	Teenage boy		
2008	The Boy Next Door	Jason		
2011	Teaching the Life of Music	Himself/narrator	Documentary	
2011	Wannabe Macks	Stu		
2011	Monte Carlo	Owen Andrews		
2011	Sisters & Brothers	Justin Montegan		
2011	Glee: The 3D Concert Movie	Finn Hudson		
2013	All the Wrong Reasons	James Ascher	Posthumous release	
2013	McCanick	Simon Weeks	Posthumous release	

=== Television ===
Year	Title	Role	Notes
2004	Stargate Atlantis	Genii Private	Episode: "The Storm"
2005	Young Blades	Marcel Le Rue	Episode: "To Heir Is Human"
2005	Supernatural	Gary	Episode: "Wendigo"
2005	Smallville	Frat cowboy	Episode: "Thirst"
2005	Killer Instinct	Windsurfer Bob	Episode: "Forget Me Not"
2006	Whistler	Lip Ring	Episode: "The Burden of Truth"
2006	Stargate SG-1	Young Cameron Mitchell	Episode: "200"
2006	Kyle XY	Charlie Tanner	7 episodes
2007	Flash Gordon	Ian Finley	Episode: "Life Source"
2007	Kaya	Gunnar	10 episodes
2008	Fear Itself	James	Episode: "New Year's Day"
2009	Mistresses	Jason	
2009	The Assistants	Shane Baker	2 episodes
2009–2013	Glee	Finn Hudson	Lead role (seasons 1–4); 81 episodes
2010	The Simpsons	Himself	Episode: "Elementary School Musical"
2011	The Cleveland Show	Finn Hudson	Episode: "How Do You Solve a Problem Like Roberta?"
2012	The Glee Project	Himself	Episode: "Vulnerability"
2013	MasterChef	Himself	Season 4, Episode 10; Last TV appearance

== Awards and nominations ==
Award	Year	Category	Work	Result	Refs
Do Something Awards	2012	TV Star: Male	Glee	Won	
Grammy Awards	2011	Best Pop Performance by a Duo or Group with Vocals	Glee	Nominated	
Hollywood Style Awards	2010	Male Future Style Icon Award	Himself	Won	
People's Choice Awards	2012	Favorite TV Comedy Actor	Glee	Nominated	
Screen Actors Guild Awards	2009	Outstanding Performance by an Ensemble in a Comedy Series	Glee	Won	
Screen Actors Guild Awards	2010	Outstanding Performance by an Ensemble in a Comedy Series	Glee	Nominated	
Screen Actors Guild Awards	2011	Outstanding Performance by an Ensemble in a Comedy Series	Glee	Nominated	
Screen Actors Guild Awards	2012	Outstanding Performance by an Ensemble in a Comedy Series	Glee	Nominated	
Teen Choice Awards	2009	Choice TV: Actor Breakout Star Male	Glee	Nominated	
Teen Choice Awards	2010	Choice TV: Comedy Actor and Choice Smile	Glee	Nominated	
Teen Choice Awards	2011	Choice TV: Actor Comedy	Glee	Won	
Teen Choice Awards	2011	Summer: Movie Star – Male	Monte Carlo	Nominated	

== Discography ==
Media offices
Preceded by Jonas Brothers	Teen Choice Awards co-host 2010	Succeeded by Kaley Cuoco
Preceded by Ron James	Gemini Awards host 2010	Succeeded by Russell Peters
