= Fag Hag (film) =

- Directed by: Damion Dietz
- Screenplay by: Damion Dietz
- Produced by: Damion Dietz, George Orff
- Starring: Stephanie Harnisch; Damion Dietz
- Cinematography: Pedro Castro
- Edited by: Vince Filippone
- Music by: Damion Dietz
- Release date: July 16, 1998
- Country: United States
- Language: English

Fag Hag is the debut film of director Damion Dietz, who also wrote the film and has a lead role in it alongside Stephanie Orff. It was released in 1998. The film has been praised for its lighting design although panned for its script.

== Cast ==
- Stephanie Orff (aka Stephanie Harnisch) as Destiny Rutt
- Damion Dietz as Scott Bushey
- Saadia Billman as Sasha Cardona
- Darryl Theirse as Pageant Director
- Wil Wheaton as Christian Bookstore Manager
- Jaush Way as Madonna-obsessed Party Host
- Keythe Farley as Confused Gay Basher
- Ann Closs as Lola Beavers
- Sharon Orff as Wakie Funches
- Jill Kocalis as Colada Bang

== Reception ==
Variety called the film "A rollicking, trashy and frequently quite clever ode to the eternal search for validation and self-esteem by ordinary people with no discernible talent". TV guide was quite more negative, stating, "This ultra-low-budget camp-fest aspires to John Waters levels of audaciousness, but its stoner humor proves closer to Cecil B. Demented than Pink Flamingos."
