= Matt Borlenghi =

American actor

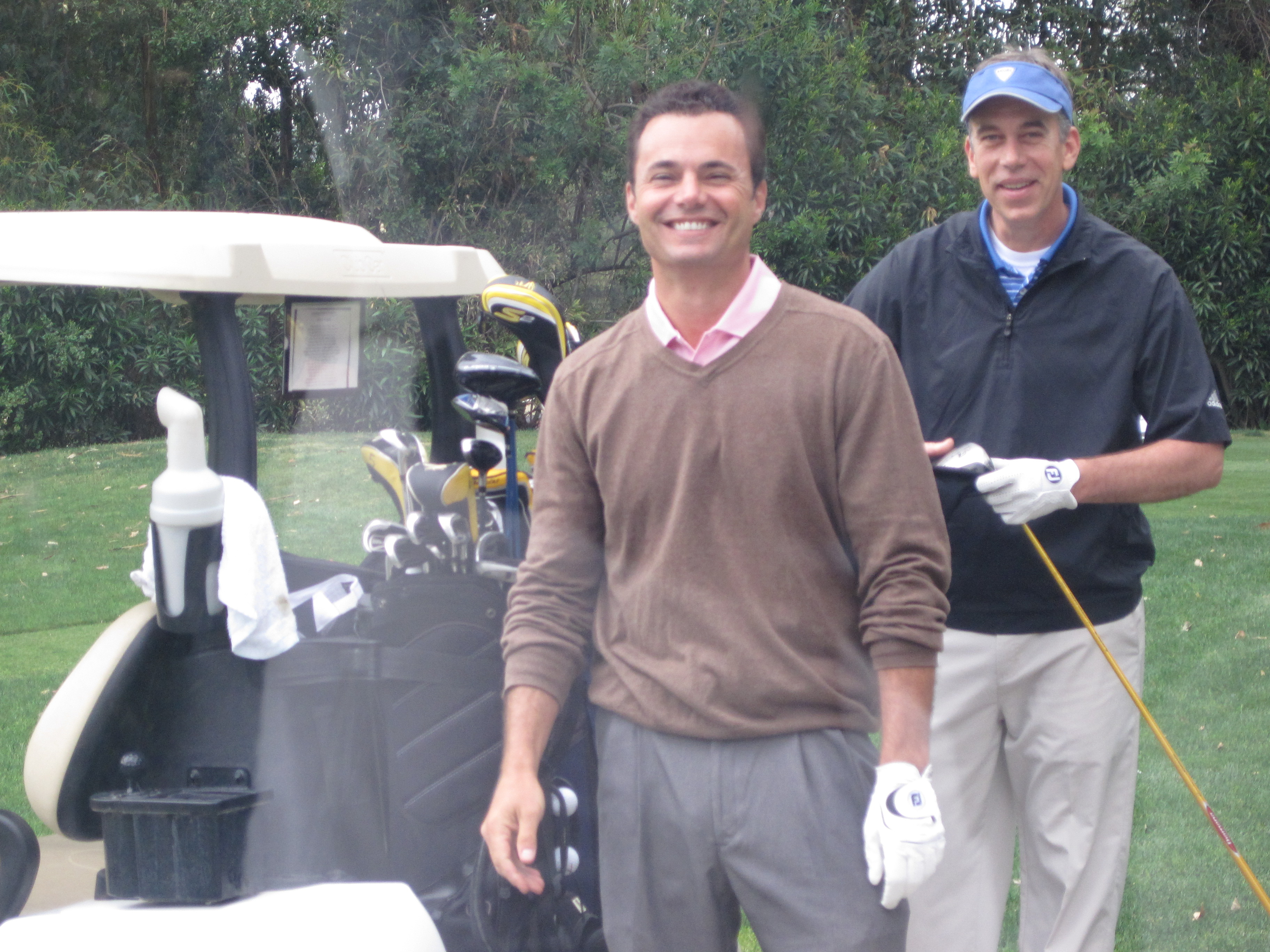
- Borlenghi at the 8th Annual Hack n' Smack Celebrity Golf Tournament in 2011
- Years active: 1987–present
- Spouse: Heather Borlenghi (m. 2003)

Matt Borlenghi is an American actor, best known for his roles as Brian Bodine on All My Children from 1991 to 1993 and 1996, as Russ on The Jeff Foxworthy Show, as Rich Casey on Police Academy: The Series and as Lyle on Cobra Kai.

== Career ==
Borlenghi came to national attention playing Brian Bodine on All My Children in the early 1990s. His character was the main romantic interest of Hayley Vaughan, played by Kelly Ripa, until he quit the show in 1993 in favor of doing comedy TV. However, later in 1996, he did make a brief return to stir things up between Hayley and new boyfriend Mateo (Mark Consuelos).

Borlenghi also played Ziggy Deadmarsh on CBS soap opera The Bold and the Beautiful in 2002, and Mayor Anthony Marino on NBC Days of Our Lives.

Borlenghi spent several years starring on various sitcoms, such as The Jeff Foxworthy Show, in which he portrayed Jeff Foxworthy's assistant Russ Francis; Pig Sty on UPN; Party Girl on FOX; and Police Academy: The Series. He also guest-starred on Melissa and Joey and other shows. He directed a short film, Jack, which won him awards on the film festival circuit. He played the title role in the adaptation independent film Jack Rio, which he also co-wrote and produced with director Gregori J. Martin ("The Bay"), and more recently starred in "Branded" and "Lethal Admirer".

Borlenghi also creates, develops, and produces reality TV shows, such as Postmortem in Vegas for LMN / A&E Networks and just completed a one-hour law enforcement drama pilot script revolving around a federal agency, "ATF".

Borlenghi moved to Atlanta, Georgia to become a part of the filming community there and landed recurring roles on two shows that film there, the Netflix series Cobra Kai and Champaign ILL. In addition, he starred as Bobby DeBarge's real-life manager Bernd Lichter in The Bobby DeBarge Story, a huge hit on TV One network. He recently wrapped filming a leading role on Can You Feel the Beat, a Lifetime TV biopic about Lisa Lisa and Cult Jam. Borlenghi also plays a role in the new video game MAFIA: Definitive Edition, as the voice of Sergio Morello.

== Filmography ==
=== Film ===
Year	Title	Role	Notes
1987	Canibal Hookers	Dwight	Video
1988	The American Scream	Brent Benziger	
1989	A Nightmare on Elm Street 5: The Dream Child	Jock	
1999	Kate's Addiction	Ezra	
2000	The Crew	Young Joey "Bats" Pistella	
2000	Krocodylus	Zack Jardine	Video
2002	Spider's Web	Bob Smooth	
2002	Psychic Murders	Ramon	Video
2004	Dinocroc	Tom Banning	
2005	Venice Underground	Detective Bobby D.	
2006	Alpha Dog	John Kirschner	
2006	Jack	Jack	Short
2006	Bloody Mary	Bobby	
2007	Cougar Club	Bartender	
2007	The Hit	Robbie Jr.	Short
2008	Jack Rio	Tommy Jamison/Jack Rio	
2008	Skeletons in the Desert	Detective Luciano	
2009	Three7Nine	Frank	Short
2011	Camel Spiders	Brad Mullins	TV movie
2011	Gil's Brother	Bob	Short
2014	Tentacle 8	Rolland Towne	
2014	Eat with Me	Drunk Steve	
2016	The Turn	Tom	
2018	A Friend's Obsession	Pete	
2019	The Bobby DeBarge Story	Bernd	TV movie
2019	Eye For An Eye	Detective Hicks	TV movie
2021	Our Dream Wedding	David	TV movie
2022	Hunting Souls	Dr. Benneth	
2022	Nobody's Angel	Agent Pogue	
2023	115 Grains	Detective Miller	
2023	The Tutor	Middle-Aged Man	
2023	Divine Influencer	Mick Golden	
2025	Can You Feel the Beat: The Lisa Lisa Story	Barry Conner	TV movie

=== Television ===
Year	Show	Role	Notes
1989	TV 101	Guy in Truck	Episode: "On the Road"
1991	Hunter	Dirk Lawson	Episode: "Fatal Obsession: Part 1 & 2"
1991–1996	All My Children	Brian Bodine	Regular Cast
1993	The John Larroquette Show	Bobby	Episode: "My Hero"
1993	Married... with Children	Ray Ray	Episode: "Hood in the Boyz"
1994	Hot Line	Paul	Episode: "Visions of Love"
1995	ER	Jimmy Falco	Episode: "Full Moon, Saturday Night"
1995	Pig Sty	Johnny Barzano	Main Cast
1995–1996	The Jeff Foxworthy Show	Russ Francis	Main Cast: Season 1
1996	Married... with Children	Tom	Episode: "Enemies"
1996	Party Girl	O'Neal	Main Cast
1997–1998	Police Academy: The Series	Rich Casey	Main Cast
1999	Pacific Blue	Milo	Episode: "Near Death"
2002	The Bold and the Beautiful	Ziggy Deadmarsh	Regular Cast
2006	Standoff	Maurice Temple	Episode: "Partners in Crime"
2006	Without a Trace	Guard	Episode: "Win Today"
2007	Dexter	Headhunter	Episode: "Morning Comes"
2008	Days of Our Lives	Mayor Anthony Marino	Regular Cast
2008	Life	Lenny	Episode: "Jackpot"
2010	Melissa & Joey	Duane Halderman	Episode: "Seoul Man"
2015	Rosewood	Gino Smith	Episode: "Aortic Atresia and Art Installations"
2016	Castle	Rollins	Episode: "Hell to Pay"
2016	Mistresses	Defense Attorney	Episode: "The New Girls"
2016	Murder in the First	Suit	Episode: "Normandy Bitch"
2018	Champaign ILL	Steve	Recurring Cast
2018–2025	Cobra Kai	Lyle	Guest Cast: Season 1-3 & 5-6
2019	Dynasty	Rick	Episode: "Caution Never Won a War"
2020	Stargirl	Ed Reilly	Episode: "Shiv Part Two"
2022	Saved by Grace	John	Episode: "What Would the Neighbors Think?"
2026	R.J. Decker	Jeff Gillibrand	Episode: "Burn the Boats"

=== Video game ===
Year	Show	Role
2020	Mafia: Definitive Edition	Sergio Morello Jr (voice and motion capture)

== Awards and nominations ==
Year	Award	Work	Category	Result
1993	Daytime Emmy Awards	All My Children	Outstanding Younger Actor in a Drama Series	Nominated
1993	Soap Opera Digest Awards	All My Children	Hottest Male Star	Nominated
1993	Soap Opera Digest Awards	All My Children	Outstanding Younger Leading Actor	Won
2006	Eureka Springs Digital Film Festival	Jack	Best Short Film	Won
