= Jaason Simmons =

Australian actor (born 1970)

- Born: Jaason Matthew Simmons; 12 July 1970 (age 56); Hobart, Tasmania, Australia
- Occupation: Actor
- Years active: 1993–present

Jaason Matthew Simmons (born 12 July 1970) is an Australian actor. He is best known for the role of Logan Fowler on the television series Baywatch.

== Early life and career ==
Simmons was born on 12 July 1970 in Hobart, Tasmania. He began acting in 1993 with a role on the short-lived Australian series Paradise Beach. The following year, he won the role of Logan Fowler on Baywatch.

After leaving the series in 1997, Simmons appeared in several theatre productions in London and had roles in several independent films including the 1997 film Nowhere. Some of his most recent onscreen appearances have been in the 2006 cult film Mad Cowgirl and in the 2013 SyFy movie Sharknado.

== Personal life ==
Simmons came out as gay in the March 2008 issue of Australian New Idea magazine with his fiancé Irish actor John O'Callaghan.

== Filmography ==
Film
Year	Film	Role	Notes
1995	Baywatch the Movie: Forbidden Paradise	Logan Fowler	Direct to video
1996	Page 73		Short movie
1997	The Sea Wolf		Alternative title: Jack London's The Sea Wolf
1997	Nowhere	The Teen Idol	
1998	Frankenstein Reborn!	Victor	
1998	The Pass	Blackjack Dealer	Alternative title: Highway Hitcher
1999	Velocity Trap	Endeavor Crew	
2003	The Devil's Tattoo	Vincent	Alternative title: Ghost Rig
2005	Frankenstein & the Werewolf Reborn!	Victor	
2006	Bloody Mary	Dr. Daniels	
2006	Mad Cowgirl	Jonathan Hunter	
2009	Friends of Dorothy	Dr. Harvard Young	Short
2012	Forgiving Winona		
2013	Sharknado	Baz Hogan	TV movie (Syfy original movie)
2015	3-Headed Shark Attack	Dr. Nelson	Direct-to-video
Television
Year	Title	Role	Notes
1993	Paradise Beach	Harry Tait	1 episode
1994–1997	Baywatch	Logan Fowler	48 episodes
1997	Viper	Steve Hoffman	1 episode
2000	This Is How the World Ends	Australian Guy	Television movie
