= Neverland (film) =

- Directed by: Damion Dietz
- Screenplay by: Damion Dietz
- Based on: Peter Pan by J. M. Barrie
- Produced by: Damion Dietz, Stephanie Kirchen
- Starring: Rick Sparks
- Cinematography: Derek Dale
- Edited by: Scott Baldyga
- Music by: Jeffery Alan Jones
- Release date: 2003
- Country: United States
- Language: English

Neverland, full title Neverland: Never Grow Up, Never Grow Old, is a 2003 indie film by director Damion Dietz with New Media Entertainment. It is a dark and surreal modern re-imagining of the classic of Peter Pan and other characters in J. M. Barrie's 1904 play Peter Pan; or, the Boy Who Wouldn't Grow Up and 1911 novel Peter and Wendy.

== Synopsis ==
The award-winning film, loosely based on Barrie's work, presents the characters with a twist. It features Peter Pan as an older, androgynous teen, whereas the fairy Tinker Bell is a drug addict and burnt out girl, the Lost Boys are hot guys and pot heads, the Darling children are adopted, Wendy Darling is black, Captain Hook is a gay leather daddy and Tiger Lily is a transvestite. The events take place in Neverland which is an amusement park in the film, rather than an imaginary island.

== Cast ==
- Rick Sparks as Peter Pan (character)
- Deborah Quayle as Mrs. Darling
- David Jahn as Mr. Darling
- Marcus Reynaga as Michael Darling
- Wil Wheaton as John Darling
- Melany Bell as Wendy Darling
- Joey as Nana
- Stephanie Kirchen as Liza (credited as Stephanie Orff)
- Kari Wahlgren as Tink
- Ryan Patrick Kelly as Tootles
- Ian Mantha as Slightly
- Eli Swanson as Curly
- Zac Cole as Nibs
- Tyler Kremer as Twin #1
- Nathan Towry as Twin #2
- Jake Winsryg as Tink's Kid
- Gary Kelley as Hook
- Scott Mechlowicz as Smee
- Kevin Christy as Crocodile
- Reed Prescott as Boyfriend
- Ray Garcia as Tiger Lily
- Monica Louwerens, Yayoi Ito, Karen Blake Challman, Roman Vasquez, Red Savage and Al Bee, as Indians
- Saadia Billman, Elena Fabri and Jill Kocalis as Mermaids
- Karim Imam as Cecco
- Gilbert Aguilera as Starkey
- Richard John Walters as Bill Jukes
- Steven Reiswig as Cookson
- Craig Jackman as Park Announcer

== Production ==
=== Writing ===
Much of the film's dialogue is based around lines from J. M. Barry's novel Peter and Wendy. This writing technique is known as pastiche. However, Dietz also drew elements from J. M. Barry's play, as well as Disney's Peter Pan.

== Release ==
Neverland was screened at the New York Lesbian and Gay Film Festival on June 11th, 2003.

== Reception ==
=== Critical Response ===
Neverland holds a 39% Popcornmeter score on Rotten Tomatoes, based on more than 2,500 audience ratings. Few critics bothered to write about the film, and those who did gave Neverland a mixed response. Four reviews contributing to its Tomatometer profile, though it did not receive a consensus rating. Among the reviews, Rory L. Aronsky awarded the film 4 out of 5 stars and gave it a Fresh rating, while Brandon Judell gave it a negative review.

In his review on Film Threat, Aronsky praised Neverland for being "fascinating, disturbing, wonderful, and sad at the same time," and for having "an incredibly original vision." However, he also criticized some of the actors' abilities.

Writing for Variety, David Rooney described the film as "boring and pointless," stating: "Despite the film’s dark mood and textured soundtrack and visuals, the uncharismatic cast and uninspired writing make this a pointless exercise."

Hillary Busis, while writing for Entertainment Weekly, described the film as "that gritty Pan adaptation nobody wanted."

=== Accolades ===
The film won the 2003 award for Best Gay Feature at the Fort Worth Gay and Lesbian Film Festival. Dietz also won an honorable mention at the Dances with Films festival.

== Legacy and Other Releases ==
=== Home Media ===
Neverland was released on DVD, although the film was never dubbed or given subtitles.

=== Legacy ===
The film had very little commercial success, which prevented it from garnering much mainstream attention.

== Themes and Analysis ==
=== Fear of growing up ===
A central theme of Neverland is the pressure the main characters feel to "grow up" and assume the maturity and responsibilities expected of young adults.

To accompany his film's main theme, Dietz leaned into the parallels Barrie set up between Captain Hook and Peter Pan. During a monologue Hook delivers about his lost youth, he says:

None of [the lost boys] loves me. They despise me. They all despise me and they love Peter Pan. The youth! The beauty! ... But, Peter Pan, even if you mock me today, you will undoubtedly become me tomorrow.

=== Escapism ===
Rather than make Neverland a faraway, magical land, Dietz opts to make Neverland a run-down amusement park that Peter Pan merely pretends is full of magic. This change made Peter Pan into an ordinary person obsessed with escaping into a made-up world, rather than a folkloric guardian of a fantastical land. Peter's obsessive escapism made him a foil to Wendy, who accepts that she must return to her normal life and grow up despite enjoying her time in Neverland.
