= Graham Wardle =

Canadian actor (born 1986)

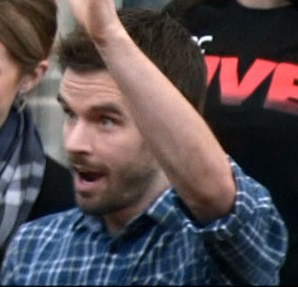
- Wardle at a CBC Live event, Sherway Gardens, Toronto
- Born: September 6, 1986 (age 39); Mission, British Columbia, Canada
- Citizenship: Canadian
- Occupations: Actor, filmmaker, photographer
- Years active: 1998 - present
- Spouse: Alison Wardle (m. 2015; div. 2018)
- Website: grahamwardleonline.com

Graham Wardle (born September 6, 1986) is a Canadian actor, filmmaker and photographer best known for his role as Ty Borden on the long running CBC series Heartland.

== Early life ==
Wardle was born in Mission, British Columbia, and was raised along with his five siblings in New Westminster, near Vancouver. Wardle studied at the Motion Picture and Production Program at Capilano University in Vancouver, graduating in 2007.

== Career ==
Wardle began his career in commercials and a variety of television shows. In 2007, Wardle appeared in the film In the Land of Women with Meg Ryan and Adam Brody. That year, he was selected to play Ty Borden in the CBC series Heartland. Wardle was nominated for two LEO Awards for the Heartland episodes Summer's End and The Starting Gate. He has appeared in the horror zombie movie, Yesterday, the film Mon Ami, the television show Supernatural and the SyFy channel movie Grave Halloween. In 2020, Wardle left Heartland as it began its 14th season, stating "I felt in my heart it was time to move in a new direction."

In 2012, Wardle produced the short film The Vessel. In the summer of 2013, Wardle co-founded Lone Maverick, a Movie Production and Entertainment Company.

Wardle currently hosts a podcast, Time Has Come, which "explores the personal journeys of his guests and how they have stepped beyond what is familiar/safe and into the unknown."

== Filmography ==
Film and Television
Year	Title	Role	Notes
1998	The Sentinel	Young Aaron	Episode: "Remembrance"
1999	The New Addams Family	Bif	Episode: "Fester the Marriage Counselor"
2000	Ratz	Tod	Movie
2001	The Outer Limits	Man	Episode: "Family Values"
2004	Life as We Know It	Adam Kitsis	Episode: "The Best Laid Plans"
2005	Killer Bash	Robert Yorke Hyde	Movie
2005 / 2013	Supernatural	Tommy Collins	Episodes: "Wendigo" "Clip Show"
2006	Fallen	Jock #2	TV movie
2006	Like Mike 2: Streetball	Bully #2	Video
2007-2021	Heartland	Ty Borden	TV show : Lead Role; Nominated – Leo Award for Best Lead Performance by a Male in a Dramatic Series (2009); Nominated – Leo Award for Best Lead Performance by a Male in a Dramatic Series (2010); Nominated – Leo Award for Best Lead Performance by a Male in a Dramatic Series (2012)
2007	Anna's Storm	Seth Corbin	TV movie
2007	In the Land of Women	Gabe Foley	Movie
2008	That One Night	Danny McKabb	Movie
2009	Yesterday	Chris	Movie
2010	A Heartland Christmas	Ty Borden	Movie
2012	Mon Ami	Hardware Store Customer	Movie
2013	Cold Lights	Sam Ross	Movie
2013	Grave Halloween	Kyle	TV movie : Syfy Channel Oct. 19 & 20, 2013

Producer and Editor and Casting Director
Year	Title	Role	Notes
2007	Versus	Editor : Casting Director	
2008	Under Pressure	Producer	"A Story of Microscopic Stakes"
2012	The Vessel	Producer	
2013	Cold Lights	Producer	Co-founder Lone Maverick Movie and Entertainment Company
