= Killer Bash =

- Written by: David Decoteau; Barbara Kymlicka
- Directed by: David Decoteau
- Starring: Raquel Riskin; Cory Monteith; Tara Wilson; Alicia Jones; Lindsay Maxwell; Lisa Marie Caruk (as Lisa Caruk); Sebastian Gacki; Caz Odin Darko; Alex Caithness; Aleks Holtz; Paula Shaw; Graham Wardle; Brandon Mills; D'Arcy Henneberry; Emery Wright
- Country of origin: Canada
- Original language: English

Production
- Executive producers: Stephen P. Jarchow; James Shavick; Kirk Shaw
- Producer: Kirk Shaw

Original release
- Release: 2005

Killer Bash is a 2005 homoerotic television horror film directed by David DeCoteau.
