= One-Eyed Monster =

- Directed by: Adam Fields
- Written by: Adam Fields; Jordan Fields; Scott Fields
- Produced by: Adam Fields; Michael Tarzian
- Starring: Amber Benson; Ron Jeremy; Charles Napier
- Cinematography: Joseph White
- Edited by: Josh Rifkin
- Music by: Adam Fields
- Distributed by: Liberation Entertainment
- Release date: November 11, 2008 (AFM)
- Running time: 84 minutes
- Country: United States
- Language: English

One-Eyed Monster is a 2008 sci-fi/horror comedy film directed by Adam Fields about the cast and crew of an adult film having an encounter with a different kind of monster while filming in the Northern California mountains.

== Plot ==
On a snow-covered mountain, a bus, truck, and a few cars arrive at a remote camp area to film a porno film. The group is made up of professional porn actors Ron Jeremy and Veronica Hart, novice porn stars Rock, Angel, Wanda, and Lance, as well as the director and producer Jim, cameraman Jonah, gaffer-electrician and sound guy T.J., and makeup and script girl Laura.

While the cast and crew are shooting the movie, Ron is apparently possessed by a strange glowing light from the sky, leading to changes in his behavior, and then his death and the disappearance of his legendary penis. The severed penis, now possessed by an alien intelligence, begins to attack and kill the other members of the cast and crew. Laura is attacked, but survives and begins to act strangely. During this time, they are joined by a rugged mountain man named Montz, who volunteers to help them because of his previous experience with a similar creature during the Vietnam War.

Despite efforts to trap it and kill it, the creature continues to kill the remaining actors and crew, including Montz, until only Jonah, Laura, and Veronica are left alive. Veronica eventually lures the creature into her vagina and uses her vaginal muscles to make the penis monster climax in a massive explosion that kills the creature and Veronica. Jonah and Laura survive, but Laura was impregnated by the penis monster in the earlier attack and has become the apparent host for the creature's offspring.

== Cast ==
- Amber Benson as Laura
- Jason Graham as Jonah
- Charles Napier as Montz
- Jeff Denton as Jim
- Caleb Mayo as T.J.
- Bart Fletcher as Lance
- Jenny Guy as Wanda
- Veronica Hart as Veronica
- Johnny Lee as Rock
- Carmen Hart as Angel
- Frank Noel as Bus Driver
- Ron Jeremy as Ron

== Critical reception ==
The film received mixed critical response. Morgan Elektra of Dread Central positively reviewed the film, noting that the "decent production values and the above par acting" in the film and that the creators "put thought into it and share an obvious love for the genre, and the result is highly entertaining." Ian Jane of DVD Talk described it as "a surprisingly well made picture that takes a ridiculous concept and an equally ridiculous cast and somehow manages to make it all work" and called it "well shot, competently directed, and most importantly, plenty entertaining." Jason Adams at JoBlo.com called the film "hilarious, played perfectly straight with just a smidgen of tongue-in-cheek awareness." Eileen Stahl at Something Awful reported the movie "was actually... pretty good. Hell, parts of it are so good that they're funny[.]" Anton Bitel of Eye for Film gave the film a rating of three stars out of five, calling it "too short to let any of its more flaccid moments bring it crashing down, and funny enough (at least in a drunken crowd) to make your eyes water." Jim McLennan of Film Blitz gave the film a D rating, commenting that "Any potential in the idea is never truly realized, thanks to a one-note script that has no idea what to do except wave its (alien) dick around, and performances that are largely forgettable[.]"
