= Bloody Mary folklore in popular culture =

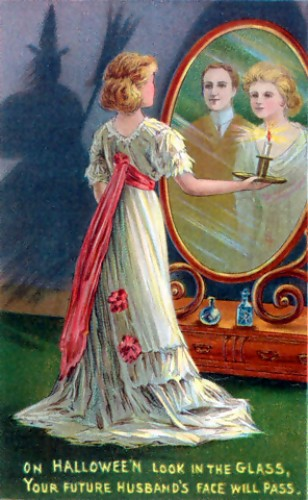
An early 20th century Halloween greeting card showing Bloody Mary

Both folk and urban legends have served as inspiration for a number of depictions of Bloody Mary, a ghost, phantom or spirit conjured to reveal the future; these are especially prevalent in films and television shows dealing with the supernatural.

== Specific cultural references ==
Specific reference to Bloody Mary are made in the following:

=== Film ===
- Urban Legends: Bloody Mary, a 2005 horror film by Mary Lambert, is the third installment in the Urban Legend series. This version of Bloody Mary was killed as part of a failed kidnapping attempt at prom in 1969. After being conjured in the present day, Mary targets the descendants of the five people responsible for her death.
- Bloody Mary, a 2006 film set in a psychiatric hospital.
- Dead Mary, a 2007 film based on a screenplay titled Bloody Mary.
- The Legend of Bloody Mary, a 2008 film by director John Stecenko, includes a character, Amy, who goes missing for good after playing the game "Bloody Mary".
- Bloody Mary, a 2011 horror film by director Charlie Vaughn in which a group of filmmakers awaken a seductive version of Bloody Mary.
- Ghost Killers vs. Bloody Mary, a 2018 Brazilian horror-comedy film about a group of ghost hunting YouTubers who are called by a school to calm down the students after Bloody Mary appears.

=== Television ===
- A season two episode of Charmed ("Chick Flick") involves a demon who makes killers from different horror movies come to life. One of these killers is Bloody Mary.
- In the Ghost Whisperer TV series' third season, an episode ("Don't Try This at Home") involves the Bloody Mary legend.
- The Supernatural episode "Bloody Mary" involves a ghost that attacked those who were looking into a mirror while her name was repeated, although she is only capable of "leaping" into mirrors within a certain range of the mirror that she killed herself in front of. In the course of the investigation, it is revealed that Bloody Mary was once an aspiring actress named Mary Worthington (portrayed by Jovanna Burke), who was found dead in front of her mirror of an apparent suicide. Mary's ghost only attacks people if they were secretly involved in the death of someone else. The Winchester brothers defeat Mary by drawing her out of her mirror and then showing her her own reflection, causing her to 'judge' herself.
- "Syzygy", an episode of The X-Files, concerns her legend.
- The two-part season 1 finale of the horror anthology show The Haunting Hour: The Series is called "Scary Mary", and mirrors, much like the Bloody Mary tale, play a major role in the episode, as Mary and her minions transport themselves through them and she can talk through them. However, she is described as being vain, dying from being inside a burning farmhouse, and her spirit is a face-stealer, as all of her minions are girls who have given their faces to her.
- Episode 2 of Gary and his Demons involves Bloody Mary as an informant who helps the demon hunter Gary to go after the latest mirror monster.
- "Jinxed", an episode of Regular Show, involves a parody of Bloody Mary where Rigby, having been jinxed by Mordecai, locks himself in a dark bathroom, writes his name on the mirror and repeats his name three times to break the jinx. However, when he does so, a demonic version of himself appears and starts terrorizing the town. In order for the demon to go away, Rigby had to say his name in reverse three times.
- The South Park episode "Hell on Earth 2006" sees Butters Stotch summoning the ghost of rapper Biggie Smalls by saying his name three times in front of the bathroom mirror with the lights off, a clear reference to Bloody Mary.
- The American Horror Stories anthology (Season 2, episode 5, Bloody Mary). She appears as a black deity that grants wishes only after one completes a gruesome task, or else she will gouge their eyes out.

=== Books ===
- The main villain of Cyber Shogun Revolution takes the name of Bloody Mary as she terrorizes the United States of Japan.
- In the young adult ghost story Who's at the Door? the author, JC Bratton, intertwines the mirror-as-portal concept with the Bloody Mary urban legend.

=== Video games ===
- Bloody Mary is a boss in the 1995 (History of the plage)
- In the action-adventure game Dishonored (2012), the player can read a book titled, Rhyme of the Rosewater Hag, which tells the story of a vengeful mother who seeks to murder her own daughter in cold blood. The book then gives instructions to an outdoor activity where the performer has to soak their head in a fountain of rose petals for three seconds and then gasp for air. If the performer is holy, the vengeful mother will spare them and not reveal herself. If the performer is sinful, then the vengeful mother will appear and strangle them with a noose made of rose thorns.
- The episodic adventure game The Wolf Among Us (2013–2014), based on the Fables comic-book series, reimagines Bloody Mary as a Fable who is the Crooked Man's sadistic enforcer and takes pleasure in prolonging the suffering of her victims. This version of the character preserves the folklore's association with mirrors: she describes children summoning her by repeatedly saying her name before a mirror, can observe others through reflective surfaces, and can use reflections to travel between locations. Her depiction combines elements from several variants of the legend. Her supernatural abilities and bodily markings resemble versions identifying Mary as a witch, while the blood and mirror shards embedded throughout her monstrous form evoke variants in which she appears mutilated or disfigured. Unlike versions of the apparition that behave as impersonal supernatural threats, this version of Bloody Mary is deliberately cruel. This shifts the traditional mirror ritual away from its mixture of apprehension and playful experimentation toward a more explicitly threatening encounter. Her physical strength, mirror-based abilities, sadistic personality, and monstrous appearance have also received recognition in retrospective assessments of video-game villains.
- The mobile and PC survival horror game Identity V (2018) features a playable hunter named Bloody Queen, or Mary, who uses mirrors as a tool and a mirror shard as a weapon. Although her backstory suggests she was born to a royal family in France, she suffered the same fate as the historical Bloody Mary in England; an execution by guillotine.
- Bloody Mary is one of the playable characters in the horror fighting game Terrordrome – Reign of the Legends (2020).
- Bloody Mary is one of the playable characters in the 2021 roguelike video game Rogue Lords. In this version, she's a young bride who was murdered the day of her wedding and revived by the Devil as a vengeful ghost who delights in bloodshed. She displays a playful, childlike personality and uses mirror-themed abilities, including placing a floating mirror behind her adversaries to replicate every attack through it.
- In the adventure game Lost Records: Bloom & Rage (2025), during the Truth or Dare sequence, if the player character Swann chooses dare, they are instructed to chant “Bloody Mary” into a mirror. After chanting it several times, an achievement titled "Here's Mary!" is unlocked.

=== Theme park ===
- Universal Studios Florida developed a new variation of the legend for the 2008 installment of their annual "Halloween Horror Nights" event, where "Mary Agana" was a doctor who studied fear by exposing her patients to it. She grew more twisted over time until eventually becoming the ghost Bloody Mary who twisted legend and lore into something dark and sinister.
- In 2025, Knott’s Scary Farm debuted a maze called Mary: The Haunting of Worth Home that used the urban legend to expand on the event’s backstory; Mary Worth, one of the sisters of alleged witch Sarah Marshall, was killed alongside her husband and children around the time her sister was hanged for witchcraft. After years of standing abandoned the house was bought and converted into a group home for foster children, who accidentally summoned Mary’s spirit during a Halloween celebration, causing the employees and children of Worth Home as well as several trick or treaters to become possessed and attack anyone who entered the property to help Mary seek out her vengeance upon the descendants of Calico’s original settlers.

=== Music ===
- American singer-songwriter Lady Gaga recorded the electropop song "Bloody Mary" for her 2011 studio album Born This Way, where the epithet referred to Mary Magdalene.

== Other ==
- The Bloody Mary Show, a British comedy web series which portrays Bloody Mary's daily life
- The Unmatched board game series featured Bloody Mary as a playable character in 2022.
- Vox Artium's 2024 show God Save the Queen told the story of Bloody Mary, winning 9th place at Winter Guard International World Championships.
