= Treehouse of Horror XXI =

- The Simpsons episode
- Promotional image for the episode
- Episode no.: Season 22; Episode 4
- Directed by: Bob Anderson
- Written by: Joel H. Cohen
- Production code: MABF16
- Original air date: November 7, 2010

Guest appearances
- Daniel Radcliffe as Edmund; Hugh Laurie as Roger

Episode chronology
← Previous "MoneyBart"	Next → "Lisa Simpson, This Isn't Your Life"
- The Simpsons season 22

"Treehouse of Horror XXI" is the fourth episode of the twenty-second season of the American animated television series The Simpsons. It first aired on the Fox network in the United States on November 7, 2010. This is the 21st Treehouse of Horror episode, and, like the other Treehouse of Horror episodes, consisted of three self-contained segments: In "War and Pieces", Bart and Milhouse discover a real-life board game that they must win to return home; in "Master and Cadaver", Marge and Homer go on a honeymoon on a sailboat, and rescue a mysterious castaway named Roger; and in "Tweenlight", Lisa falls in love with a vampire named Edmund.

"Treehouse of Horror XXI" was written by Joel H. Cohen and directed by Bob Anderson. Daniel Radcliffe and Hugh Laurie both guest starred in the episode. The first segment references Jumanji, the second is a loose parody of Dead Calm and the third satirizes the Twilight novel and film series. The episode also contains references to The Office, A Clockwork Orange and Sesame Street.

In its original airing on the Fox Network during the November sweeps period, the episode had a 3.7 Nielsen rating viewed in approximately 8.2 million homes. Critical opinion of the episode was mixed, with "Tweenlight" generally being regarded as the best of the three segments.

== Plot ==
=== Opening sequence ===
While carving pumpkins, Bart takes a knife and etches a smile into Homer's pants. Homer responds by strangling Bart as usual, and Bart puts a flaming pumpkin on Homer's head. Professor Frink then welcomes the audience and warns them of the content of the show, presenting a TiVo remote control to fast-forward through the scary stuff; he shows an example by fast forwarding through Homer and Bart's fight, but accidentally fast forwards all the way to the end of the special, exposing spoilers. A shameful Frink declares he didn't deserve to use the remote, then turns the remote towards himself and "fast forwards" through his life, aging incredibly rapidly until he is turned to a pile of dust, which is blown away by a gust of wind revealing the title of the episode. The Frankenstein's Monster who was created by Frink then takes the remote and declares he will change it to The Office, comparing Dunder Mifflin to his own office job. The opening then ends with a parody of said show's opening credits, the various characters portrayed by Frankenstein, the Mummy, the Wolf Man, a zombie, and a witch.

=== War and Pieces ===
In a parody of Jumanji, Marge, worried about the effects of excessively violent video games, encourages Bart and Milhouse to try playing some of the classic board games in the attic. After rejecting the "lame" ones, they discover an old board game called "Satan's Path". Upon playing it, all the rejected games come to life, turning the town into a giant game board. Lisa reads the instructions, which are in Latin, and says the two must beat all the games to finish Satan's Path and restore everything to normal. Milhouse needlessly allows himself to drown during the game of Scrabble, but Bart manages to finish it, returning everything to normal (even bringing Milhouse back to life). Bart and Milhouse state that they will just play hangman, but the game brings the hangman to life. With only four letters remaining (WHEE_ _F F_RT_NE), Milhouse guesses the number 3, which results in Bart and Milhouse being hanged.

=== Master and Cadaver ===
In a parody of Dead Calm, Homer and Marge set sail on a romantic second honeymoon. Their time together is interrupted when they rescue a castaway. Introducing himself as Roger, the castaway explains that he was a chef on a yacht called the Albatross, and was knocked out after attempting to stop a poisoning on his ship. Roger makes them a pie, but Homer becomes convinced that Roger poisoned the guests on the Albatross. He grabs the pie from Marge and throws it out the window. Marge chastises Homer, but looks out a window and sees a dead shark with the pie pan in its mouth. Homer and Marge take matters into their own hands as they seemingly kill Roger using a metal pole, and knock his body overboard. However, finding the Albatross, they realize Roger was telling the truth and that some of the passengers are still alive, as one of the people administered an antidote. Roger appears and explains that the shark they saw had died from a fuel leakage from Homer and Marge's boat. Homer then kills Roger, the surviving Albatross crew, and a pelican, to cover their tracks. However, unable to bear the guilt, Marge eats the poisoned pie, much to Homer's horror. The story is then revealed to be Maggie's imagination while she is taking a bath. Homer asks Marge what Maggie thinks about while bathing, which she responds, "Just sugar plums and buttercups." Maggie then shadily moves her eyes (revealing eyeliner over one eye), puts on a hat, and drinks milk like Alex from A Clockwork Orange as the theme from the movie briefly plays in the background.

=== Tweenlight ===
In a parody of Twilight, Lisa falls in love with a mysterious new student named Edmund. After saving Lisa from a bus, two cars, a bicycle and a Segway PT, Edmund reveals he is a vampire. Lisa is not frightened by this and the two begin a romance, much to the dismay of Milhouse, who turns into a were-poodle. Marge invites Edmund and his father, Count Dracula, to dinner. Edmund and Lisa are both embarrassed by their fathers and decide to leave. Homer and Dracula track them down to a cathedral in "Dracula-la Land". They see Edmund climbing up a tower with Lisa, so Homer forces Dracula to carry him up. Lisa wants to become a vampire, explaining that she wants to be a part of their rich culture and to organise events to prevent unfair vampire stereotypes, but has second thoughts after learning that she would be eight years old forever. Edmund says that "the bloodlust is upon him" and he has to bite something. Homer stops Edmund with a cross, and is amazed to learn vampires love their kids also when Dracula grabs the cross to save Edmund. Edmund and his father reconcile, and Homer saves Lisa by offering himself up in her place as the two vampires feast on him. However, they both die from the bad cholesterol in Homer's blood as he is turned into a vampire. Transforming into a bat to fly home, Homer's fat causes him to fall to his death. His body is carried off by were-poodle Milhouse while Lisa watches in dismay.

== Production ==
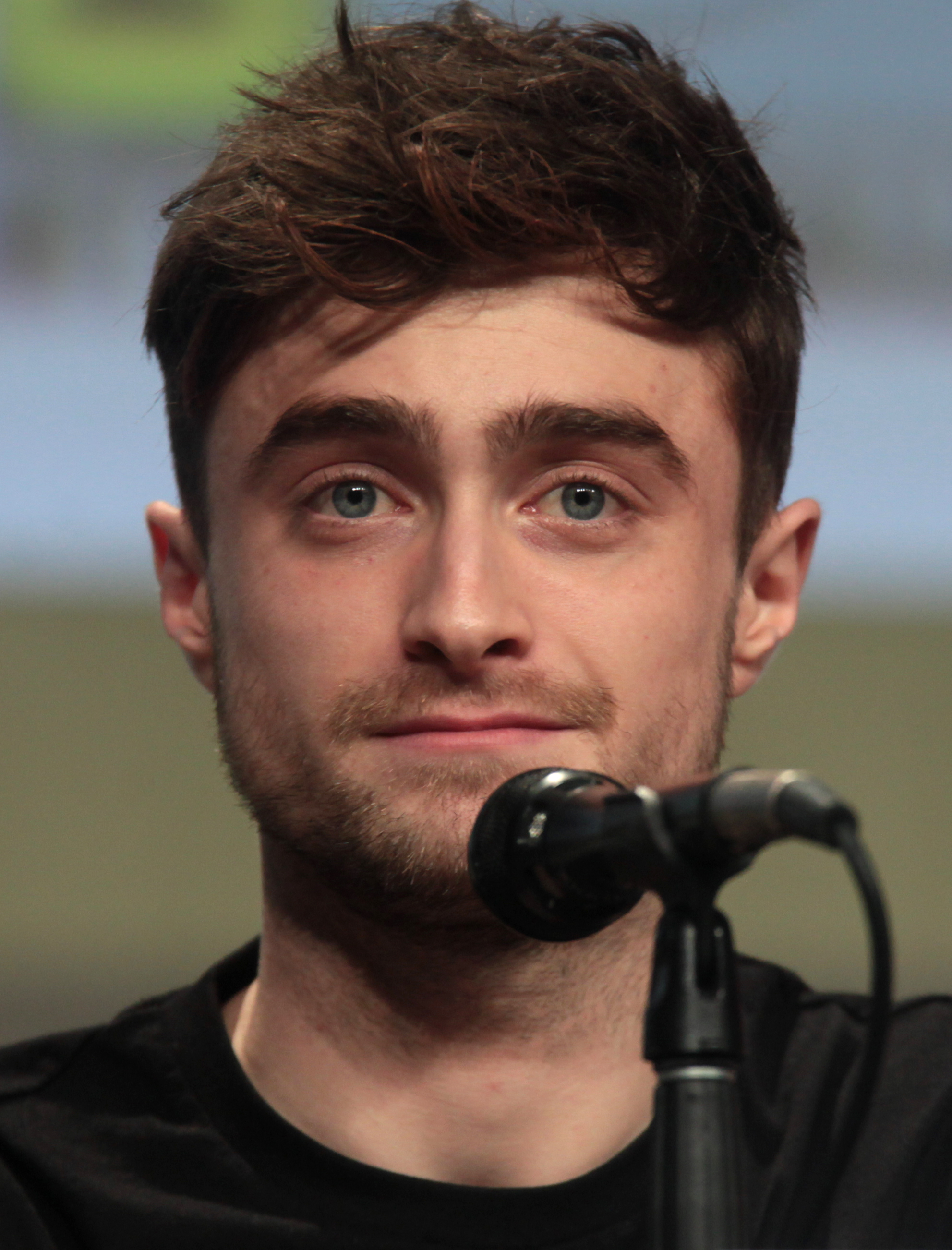
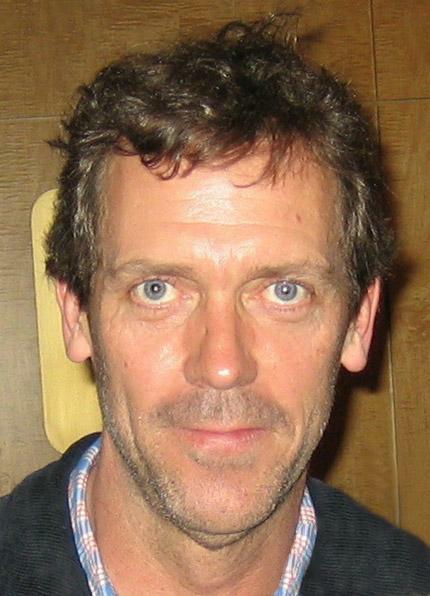
Daniel Radcliffe (left) and Hugh Laurie (right) guest starred in this episode, with Laurie playing castaway Roger and Radcliffe playing vampire Edmund, respectively

The episode was written by Joel H. Cohen, and it was his first sole writing credit for a Treehouse of Horror episode. He previously wrote the "Hex and the City" segment of season 13's "Treehouse of Horror XII". Bob Anderson served as director. It was his third Treehouse of Horror episode, the first two being season seven's "Treehouse of Horror VI" and season 20's "Treehouse of Horror XIX". Daniel Radcliffe, star of the Harry Potter film series, guest starred as Edmund in the third segment which parodies the Twilight novel and film series. Radcliffe said that he is a fan of the show and guest starring is "a huge honour. The Halloween episode has become a big tradition in The Simpsons so I'm very excited to be part of it. There was a time when I was 12 or 13 when 50 percent of everything I knew about the world came from The Simpsons, so this is a big deal." Hugh Laurie of Blackadder and House guest starred as Roger in "Master and Cadaver".

The episode aired November 7, 2010, making it the tenth Treehouse of Horror episode to air after Halloween. The previous year's episode had aired October 18. This episode is also tied with the fifteenth Treehouse of Horror with the latest premiere date.

== Cultural references ==
The opening segment ends with a parody of the opening credits of The Office, featuring various monsters like the Frankenstein's monster, the Mummy, and the Wolf Man among others working in "Monster Mifflin".

The plot of "War and Pieces" references the film Jumanji. Some of the board games referenced to include Chutes and Ladders and Mouse Trap. Milhouse's death, where he lets go of a ledge and sinks into water, is a reference to Jack Dawson's death in Titanic. The answer for the hangman game Bart and Milhouse played is Wheel of Fortune. Milhouse banging his head against the post, saying, "Stupid, Stupid, Stupid!", is a reference to Boogie Nights.

The second segment, "Master and Cadaver", is based on the film Dead Calm. The title is a reference to the film Master and Commander: The Far Side of the World. At the end of the segment, Maggie imitates Alex from the film A Clockwork Orange.

"Tweenlight" parodies the Twilight novel and film series. Edmund is based on Edward Cullen, the character portrayed by Robert Pattinson in Twilight and its sequels. Edmund's father is Count Dracula. Count von Count from PBS's Sesame Street and Yogi Bear also have cameo appearances in the segment. Other famous vampires with cameo appearance are: Dracula from Bram Stoker's Dracula, Grandpa Munster, Count Orlock, Blacula, Selene, Elvira, Mistress of the Dark and Count Chocula. At one point Edmund yells "You're tearing me apart!" to his father. This could be a reference to James Dean's character in the 1955 film Rebel Without a Cause or Tommy Wiseau's character in the 2003 film The Room.

== Reception ==
In its original airing on the Fox Network during the November sweeps period, the episode had a 3.7 Nielsen rating and 9% share of the audience in the 18-49 demographic, and was viewed in approximately 8.2 million homes. The episode was up 23% in viewership compared with the previous episode, "MoneyBart", which aired October 10.

The episode received mixed critical reviews, with "Tweenlight" generally being regarded as the best segment. John Griffiths of Us Weekly gave the episode three stars, writing that "the three oddball tales run from mildly amusing to flat-out inspired. In one goofy vignette, Homer and a bikini-wearing Marge pluck a scary mystery man from the sea. However, watching Lisa crush on a brooding vampire in a dead-on poke at Twilight is the hilarious treat here." Fred Topel of Screen Junkies wrote, "The best jokes in all the segments are actually not the spoofs. They’re the cartoon physical comedy, the references to mundane frustrations like having to be the thimble when playing Monopoly. It’s also super gory. [..] I think “The Simpsons” are still on the creative upswing since The Simpsons Movie and this “Treehouse of Horrors” would hold up with classics like "The Shinning" and "The Homega Man." Brad Trechak of TV Squad felt that it was one of the best Treehouse of Horrors in years. He wrote, "Of the three vignettes, the first segment 'War and Pieces,' while not the best, was the most original despite being a variation of the plot of 'Jumanji.' Unlike that book/movie, instead of the game coming into the real world, the game brings other board games into the real world. The satire on this show remains sharp as none of the games had the same name as their real world counterparts to prevent toy company litigation against Fox. [..] The final segment 'Tweenlight'... was the best of the three. It felt a little less dated than the first two."

Robert Bianco of USA Today was critical of the episode, writing "It is possible [that The Simpsons] has worn out the Treehouse franchise. [The] three installments just seem to be reaching for jokes that aren't there, and falling in the attempt. [...] As you'd hope from The Simpsons, the segments all boast a few clever moments that will make you smile if not laugh. But they're not scary, they're not particularly funny, and outside of some tepid Twilight jokes, they're no longer even trying to be real parodies of the original stories." Emily VanDerWerff of The A.V. Club also gave the episode a negative review, and felt that "There were laughs in all three segments, but the episode as a whole left something to be desired. The first [...] eventually descended into a long string of mostly lame board game jokes, as if the writers had been coming up with board game puns for the last 15 seasons or something and wanted an excuse to unload a bunch of them all at once. The idea of Bart and Milhouse playing with a Ouija board ripoff was promising, so to see it descend into gags about Marge getting sucked into Clue was disappointing. There were fewer good gags [in "Master and Cadaver"] than in the board game segment, but it was balanced out by a fairly solid Hugh Laurie performance. The last segment, the inevitable Twilight parody, was funny across the board, both in how it took the piss out of the Twilight films and how it satirized vampire mania. [...] Still, it wasn't the best "Treehouse" ever, and you could make a good claim for it being the worst, particularly if the Twilight segment wasn't in there."

Alf Clausen's score for the episode received a nomination for the Primetime Emmy Award for Outstanding Music Composition for a Series at the 63rd Primetime Emmy Awards.
