= Loan-a Lisa =

- The Simpsons episode
- Episode no.: Season 22; Episode 2
- Directed by: Matthew Faughnan
- Written by: Valentina L. Garza
- Production code: MABF17
- Original air date: October 3, 2010

Guest appearances
- Chris Hansen as himself; Muhammad Yunus as himself; Mark Zuckerberg as himself; Terry W. Greene as a janitor

Episode features
- Chalkboard gag: "I did not see the teacher applying for welfare"
- Couch gag: The family finds a dead man on their living room floor, then run from the police in their couch. They are soon arrested, identified in a line-up, and executed on an electric couch.

Episode chronology
← Previous "Elementary School Musical"	Next → "MoneyBart"
- The Simpsons season 22

"Loan-a Lisa" is the second episode of the twenty-second season of the American animated television series The Simpsons. It originally aired on the Fox network in the United States on October 3, 2010. In the episode, Lisa helps fund Nelson's bicycle company with money Grampa Simpson gives her as part of his inheritance, but after Nelson meets Facebook founder Mark Zuckerberg and is convinced he can be successful by dropping out of school, Lisa tries to convince Nelson to stay in school. Meanwhile, Homer gets addicted to buying expensive items and returning them.

The episode was written by Valentina L. Garza and directed by Matthew Faughnan, after Yeardley Smith suggested writing one centered around microfinancing. It guest starred Mark Zuckerberg, Chris Hansen and Muhammad Yunus.

The episode received positive reviews from critics. According to the Nielsen Media Research receiving a 4.1/11 in the 18-49 demographic going up from the previous episode both in the demographic and in total viewers.

== Plot ==
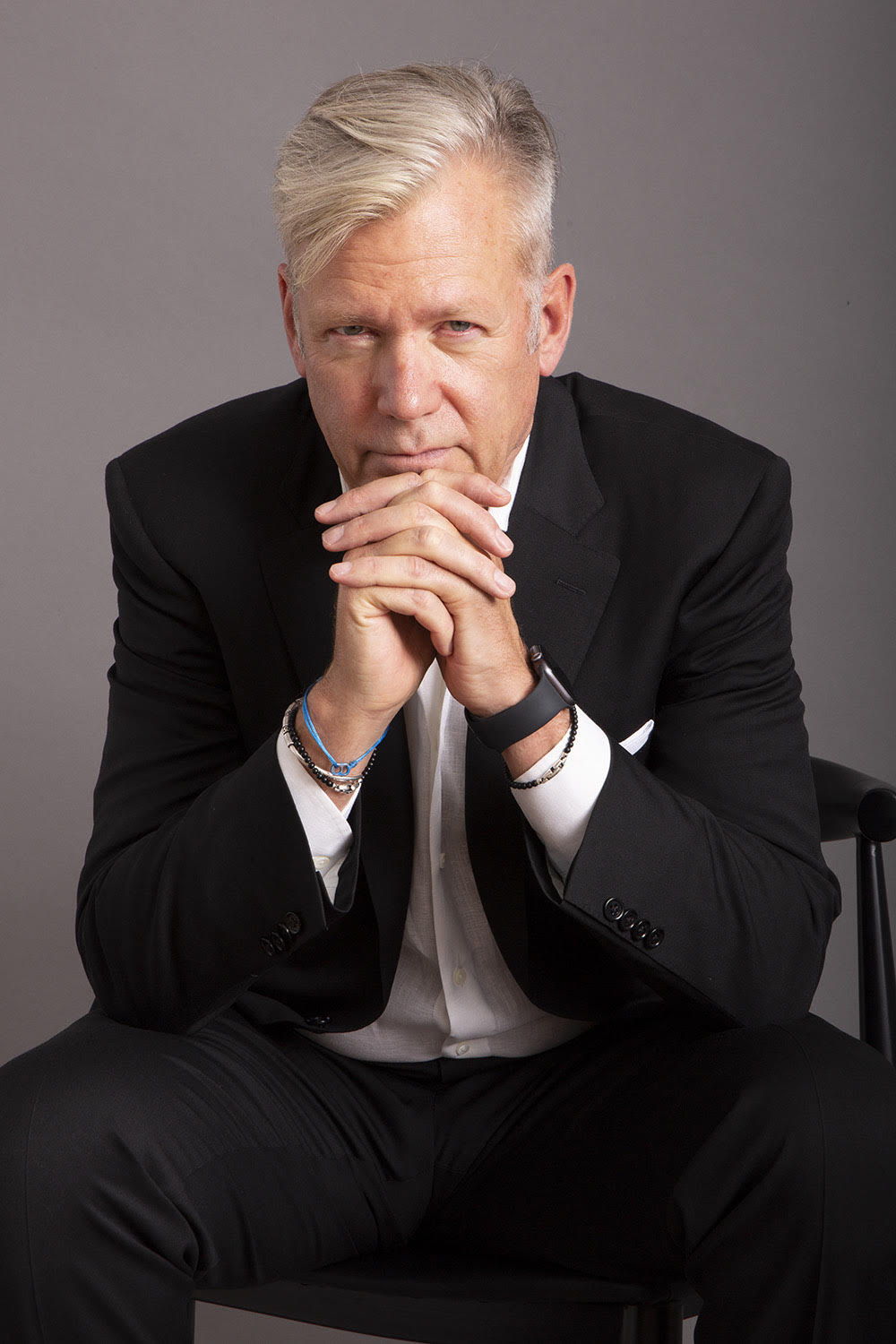
Chris Hansen guest stars as himself hosting To Catch a Credit Whore.

Grampa decides to give his family their inheritance now, rather than make them wait until after his death. Each person's share turns out to be $50, and they decide to spend it at Costington's. Bart pays Gil Gunderson to walk up the down escalator, while Marge picks out a purse but mis-reads its $500 price tag as $50. Pressure from other shoppers leads her to charge it to her credit card; though she cannot afford it, Homer suggests that she use it until the store's return period is about to expire, then take it back. During dinner at a fancy restaurant, Marge tries her best to keep the purse clean, but Homer ruins it by dropping shrimp sauce on it. She is still able to return the purse despite this damage, and Homer begins buying expensive items on credit and returning them in time for a refund. Homer is eventually caught doing so on camera by Chris Hansen in a special entitled To Catch a Credit Whore, forcing Homer to flee in shame (but not before signing a contract authorizing use of his image for TV).

Meanwhile, Lisa decides to donate her $50 to charity, but an online introduction to microfinance and a video from Muhammad Yunus prompt her to use the money to support a local business instead. She gives Nelson Muntz a loan for his fledgling bicycle company, which rapidly begins to flourish. He decides to drop out of school in order to invest all his time in the business; Lisa is upset by the news, but Principal Skinner thinks it would pay nicely as a part-time job. At a meeting of entrepreneurs, Lisa tries to persuade Nelson to stay in school, unfortunately, she discovers that the attendees all left college (including Mark Zuckerberg, Bill Gates, and Richard Branson), and that the janitor is the only person present who did not drop out. Grampa comforts her, saying that money cannot change people, and she accepts Nelson's decision to drop out. The business soon fails due to Nelson's unwitting use of water-soluble glue which causes his customisations to fall apart. After the experience, he concludes that returning to school would not be a bad thing and gives the original $50 to Skinner, who sees it as a huge improvement over the school's shoestring budget. Though Lisa has lost her money, Nelson makes it up to her by taking her skating, during which they knock down Zuckerberg and several other people.

== Production ==
=== Development ===
Yeardley Smith, a supporter of Grameen Foundation, pitched an idea to executive producer Al Jean about Lisa and micro-financing. Smith became a fan of micro-financing after watching Oprah Winfrey interview economist Muhammad Yunus.

=== Casting ===
Yunus was approached by the producers to appear in the episode. He was familiar with the show through his daughter, who encouraged him to do it. Yunus himself did not watch the show, but wanted to present his work for future generations. He learned more about the show through Yeardley Smith. The script for him was already written, and he gave them his comments. Yunus recorded his line at the BBC Radio studio in Dhaka.

In August 2010, Fox incorrectly announced that internet entrepreneur Mark Zuckerberg would appear as himself in the episode "MoneyBart." However, Zuckerberg would appear in this episode as himself.

== Cultural references ==
In the beginning of the episode, Bart and Lisa are watching an Itchy and Scratchy parody of Up. Chris Hansen is seen hosting To Catch a Credit Whore, a parody of his previous show, To Catch a Predator. Grampa Simpson reveals he lost most of his life savings by investing in a failed Broadway musical about Eddie Gaedel, the smallest person to ever play in a Major League Baseball game.

== Reception ==
In its original American broadcast, "Loan-a Lisa" was viewed by an estimated 8.59 million households receiving 4.1 rating/11 share in the 18-49 demographic going up 0.5 in the demographic. It was the most viewed show on Animation Domination in both viewers and 18-49 demographic.

Rowan Kaiser of The A.V. Club gave the episode a grade of B− said "spending time with The Simpsons tends to make me happy, and nothing about this episode was particularly terrible."

TV Squad's Brad Tachek gave the episode a positive review as well saying "Tonight's episode wasn't quite as good as last week and just about as preachy, but it was still a good example of what makes 'The Simpsons' great."

Eric Hochberger of TV Fanatic gave the episode 3.7 out of 5 stars. He thought the story was well-written but disliked the Mark Zuckerberg cameo.
