= Bart Fletcher =

American actor

- Born: US
- Occupations: Actor, director, writer, producer
- Website: www.bartfletcher.com

Bart Fletcher (born May 10, 1980) is an American actor, writer, producer and director. Fletcher has appeared in feature films, as well as television series and shorts. Fletcher is best known for his role in the 2008 cult sci-fi/horror hit One-Eyed Monster. In 2011, he wrote, produced and directed the short film Oh Oliver!.

== Career ==
In 2008, he had a starring role in the sci-fi/ horror film One-Eyed Monster as Lance.

== Filmography ==
=== Director, producer, writer ===
- 2011: Oh Oliver! (short)

=== Actor ===
Films

- 2008: One-Eyed Monster as Lance
- 2010: White Wall as Medic
- 2010: Look Closer as Vander
- 2011: The Chicago 8 as Officer Riggio

Television

- 2005: General Hospital (TV series) (in one episode "Young A.J. Quartermaine" as Young A.J. Quartermai)
- 2006: Untold Stories of the ER (TV series, 1 episode "Director Down" as Kyle)
- 2007: Veronica Mars (TV series, 1 episode "Un-American Graffiti" as Jimmy)
- 2007-8: Everybody Hates Chris (TV series, 2 episodes "Everybody Hates Kwanzaa" and "Everybody Hates Being Cool" as Johnny Boy in both)
- 2011: Time Jumper (TV series, 8 episodes as Terry Dixon)

Shorts

- 2004: As Cool as Jennifer as Mike (short)
- 2005: Little Bear as Jake (short)
- 2006: Lonely in Los Angeles as Rookie Cop (short)
- 2009: Death in Charge as Brad (short)
- 2010: Designated as Cliff (short)
- 2011: Oh Oliver! as Robert (short)
