= Jason Sechrest =

American journalist

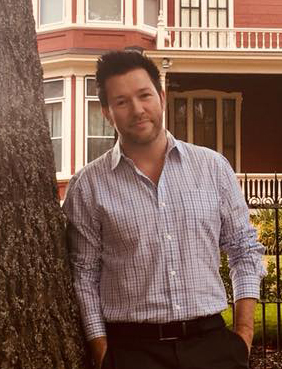
- Jason Sechrest
- Born: November 26, 1979 (age 46); Columbus, Indiana, U.S.
- Occupations: Author, journalist

Jason Sechrest (born November 26, 1979, Columbus, Indiana) is an author and journalist. He began his writing career at 15 years old as a staff writer for Femme Fatales, an entertainment publication. He interviewed actresses from horror B movies, science-fiction and fantasy films. In 2016, he was hired by Cemetery Dance Publications to write a regular column called “What I Learned From Stephen King” In it, he explores the wisdom, life lessons, and spirituality hidden within Stephen King's many works.

In 2017, Sechrest became a published author of horror fiction. His short horror story "Jonah Inside the Whale: A Meditation" was published by Scarlet Galleon Publications in the paperback horror anthology, Fearful Fathoms: Collected Tales of Aquatic Terror (Volume One).

Sechrest currently owns and operates the website SechrestThings.com, dedicated to his insights on the horror genre. His last post was in 2020.
