= Elementary School Musical (The Simpsons) =

- The Simpsons episode
- Episode no.: Season 22; Episode 1
- Directed by: Mark Kirkland
- Written by: Tim Long
- Production code: MABF21
- Original air date: September 26, 2010

Guest appearances
- Jemaine Clement as Ethan Ballantyne; Bret McKenzie as Kurt Hardwick; Lea Michele as Sarah; Cory Monteith as Flynn; Amber Riley as Aiesha; Ira Glass as himself; Stephen Hawking as himself

Episode features
- Chalkboard gag: "When I slept in class, it was not to help Leo DiCaprio"
- Couch gag: A banner appears above the couch celebrating the show's 22nd season. A Fox executive approaches the family with a cupcake, takes a bite, and walks away, disappointing the family.

Episode chronology
← Previous "Judge Me Tender"	Next → "Loan-a Lisa"
- The Simpsons season 22

"Elementary School Musical" is the twenty-second season premiere of the American animated television series The Simpsons. It originally aired on the Fox network in the United States on September 26, 2010. In this episode, Krusty the Clown invites Homer to the Nobel Peace Prize Ceremony in Oslo. Later turning out to be a hoax, Krusty is sued by the International Court of Justice for his many instances of public indecency. Meanwhile, Marge takes Lisa to a performing arts camp for a week.

The episode was written by Tim Long and directed by Mark Kirkland. Upon airing, it was met with mixed reception from television critics. "Elementary School Musical" was viewed by 7.8 million viewers and attained a 3.7/8 rating in the 18–49 demographic, according to Nielsen ratings. The episode features guest appearances by Lea Michele, Amber Riley, and Cory Monteith from the musical television show Glee, as well as Jemaine Clement and Bret McKenzie, Ira Glass, and Stephen Hawking.

== Plot ==
As Homer, Lisa, and her friends watch the announcement of the year's Nobel Prize winners, they are astounded to hear that Krusty the Clown has won the Peace Prize. Krusty picks Homer to accompany him to Oslo for the awards ceremony to ensure that his jokes will be met with laughter, and Homer decides to take Bart with him. Their plane lands in The Hague, and it is revealed that the Peace Prize announcement was a ruse to bring Krusty there so he could be tried by the International Court of Justice for his deplorable public behavior over the years, such as dropping a monkey from the Eiffel Tower in Paris, and stealing the act from a local clown in The Hague. Homer and Bart search desperately for any evidence to show that Krusty has made a genuine contribution to humanity, and eventually argue that his refusal to perform at Sun City because he wanted potato chips led directly to the South African government's decision to release Nelson Mandela from prison. Even though these two incidents are not connected in any way, the court accepts this argument and frees Krusty, who immediately seeks out the nearest place to buy marijuana — the courthouse cafeteria.

Meanwhile, Marge surprises Lisa, who is despondent about Bart attending the Peace Prize ceremony instead of her, by sending her to a performing arts camp for a week. She eagerly immerses herself there in music and theater, meeting several campers who love to break into song and two guitar-playing hipster counselors, Ethan and Kurt. When Marge takes her home at the end of the week, Lisa has trouble readjusting to normal life and looks for a chance to express her newly awakened creative side. She runs away from home and seeks out Ethan and Kurt in "Sprooklyn", described by the counselors as the "artistic hotbed of Springfield". However, she soon learns that they have grossly exaggerated the area, which is really a run-down slum, and that they actually work at a sandwich shop. They sing a song about the difficulties of being an artist, during which Krusty gets beaten up for accidentally announcing he is the prison snitch. Ethan and Kurt encourage her to return to her family and think about trying to make an artistic name for herself when she is older. As Marge arrives to take Lisa home, Ethan and Kurt show off a mural that they have painted in her honor, which takes up an entire side of a building.

== Production ==
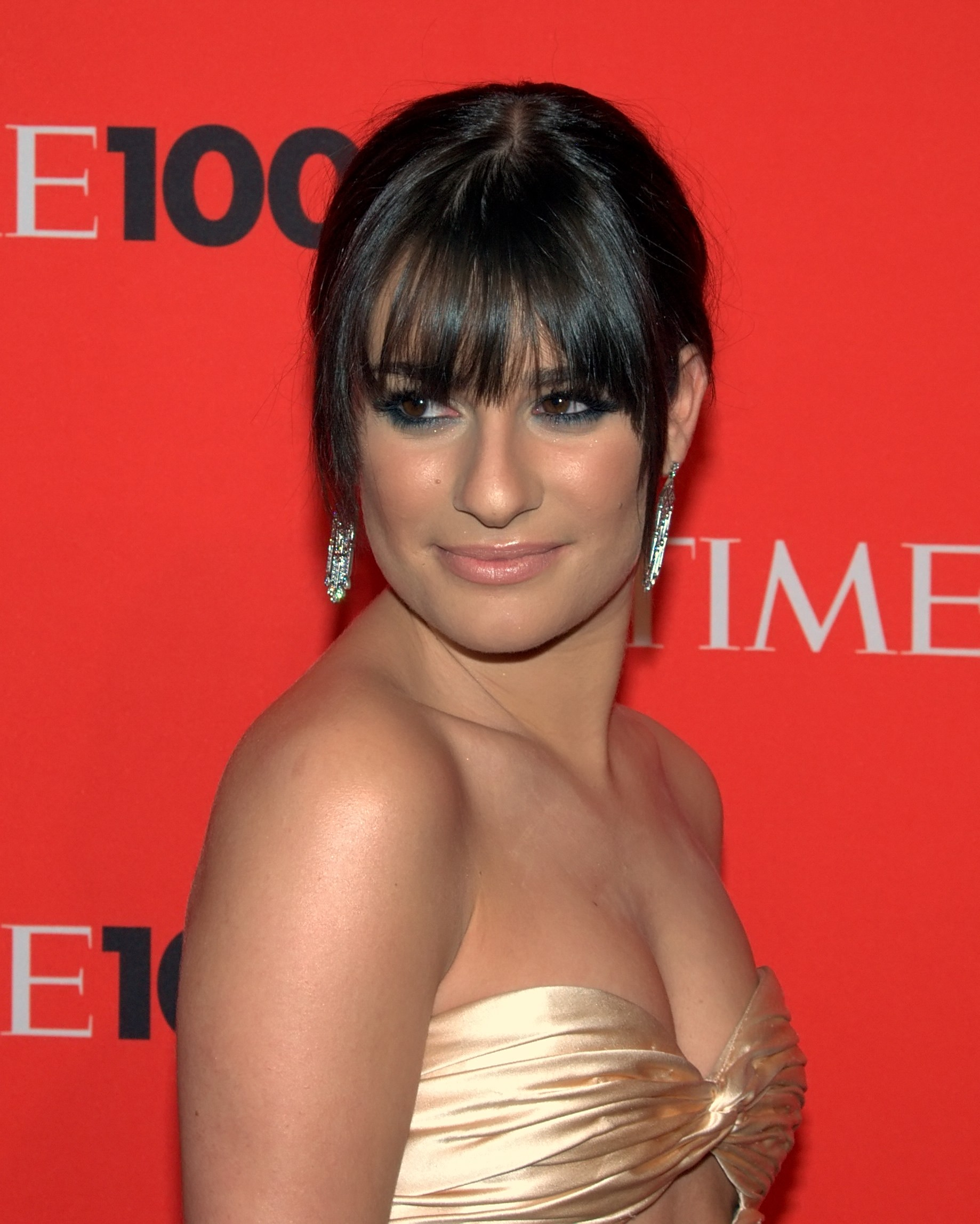
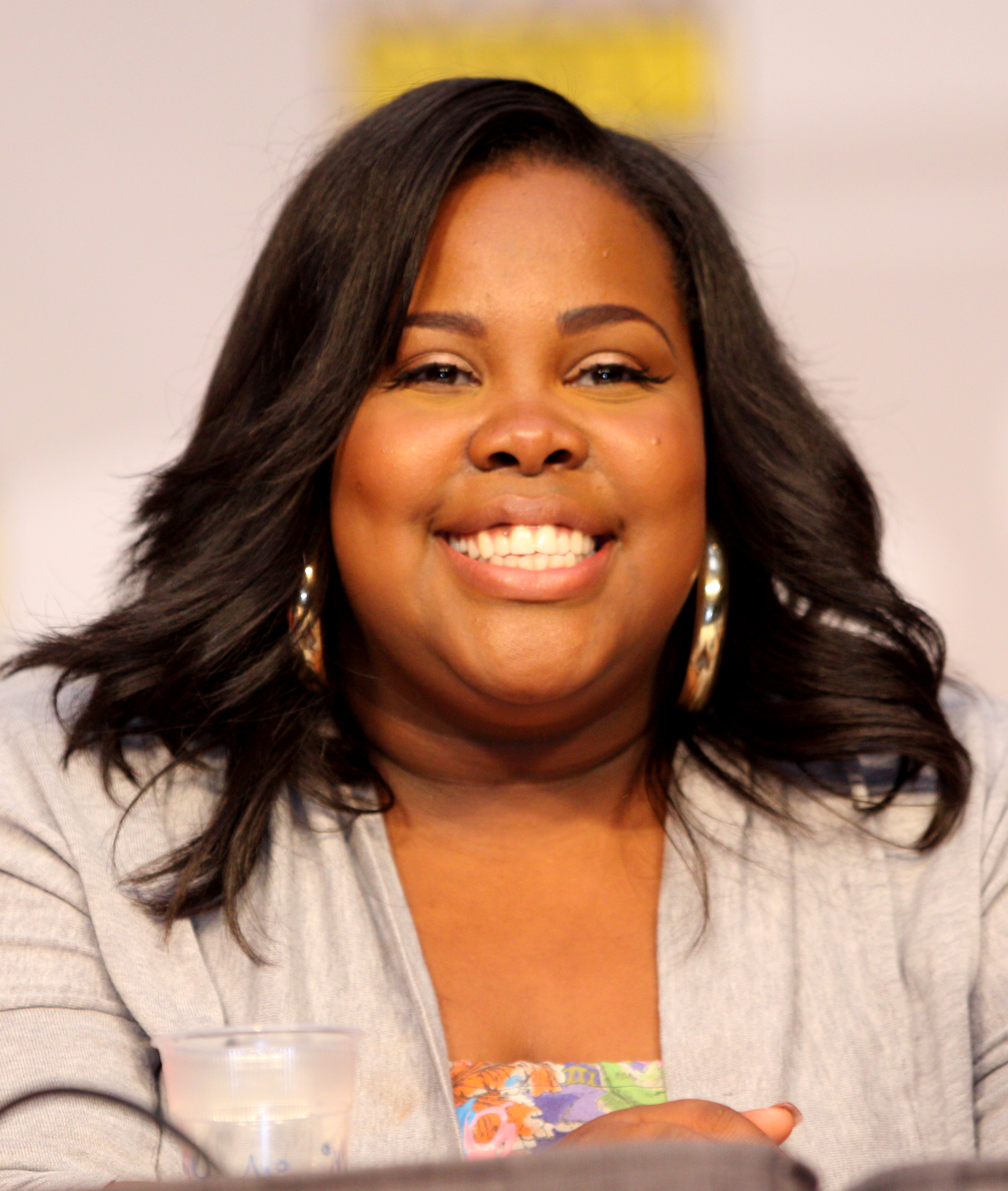
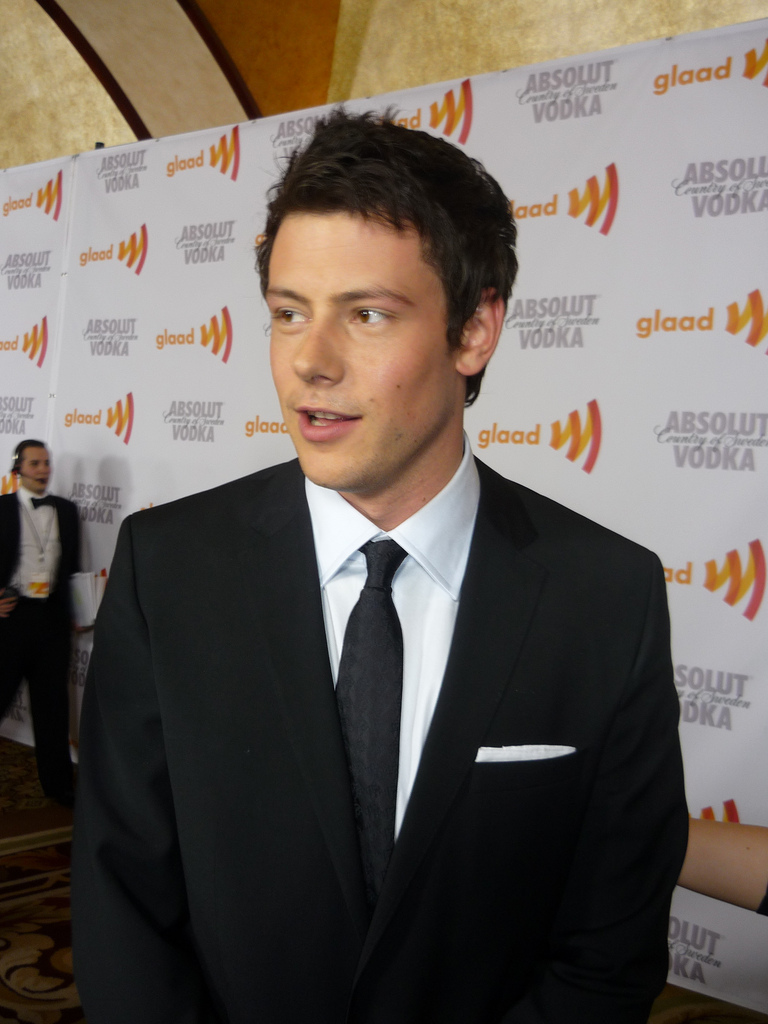
"Elementary School Musical" featured guest appearances from Glee cast members Lea Michele (left), Amber Riley (center), and Cory Monteith (right).

"Elementary School Musical" was written by Tim Long and directed by Mark Kirkland. The episode features guest appearances from Lea Michele, Cory Monteith, and Amber Riley from the Fox series Glee. The three previously revealed their appearances on Twitter in February 2010. Physicist Stephen Hawking also made an appearance. Flight of the Conchords members Jemaine Clement and Bret McKenzie first rehearsed their lines over the phone with Nancy Cartwright, the voice of Bart, before flying to the United States to record their parts for the show. Clement, a fan of the show since it first aired as shorts on The Tracey Ullman Show, said that he and McKenzie would play new characters, rather than themselves. He continued:

Yeah, we were over the moon. We don't play ourselves, because most people won't know who we are, but they'll look like yellow versions of ourselves. We play counsellors at an arts camp that Lisa's going to. It's pretty fun. We just went to a studio and recorded it, but, yeah, we were really flattered.

The opening sequence features Otto Mann in a Partridge Family-like bus, while the chalkboard gag makes a reference to the film Inception. The Glee cast members sing a version of "Good Vibrations" by the Beach Boys. Krusty the Clown had a Super Bowl "nip slip", appeared on The Electric Company and was seen using a child as a human shield in a similar manner to the character Greg Stillson from The Dead Zone. Lisa listens to This American Life, a public radio program voiced by Ira Glass. Also, Ethan and Kurt have a map of Middle Earth on the wall of their apartment. Krusty's comment that "I ain't gonna play Sun City" is a reference to Steven van Zandt's famous protest song.

== Reception ==
"Elementary School Musical" was initially broadcast on September 26, 2010, in the United States as part of the animation television night on Fox. Upon airing, the episode was viewed by 7.8 million households. "Elementary School Musical" garnered a 3.7/8 rating in the 18–49 demographic, according to the Nielsen ratings. "Elementary School Musical" ranked twenty-third in the 18–49 demographic for the week.

Television critics were polarized with "Elementary School Musical".

Emily VanDerWerff of The A.V. Club gave the episode a 'C+' grade. Although she expressed satisfaction towards many aspects of the episode, such as the character development of Lisa Simpson, VanDerWerff criticized the songs performed in the episode. In response to the appearance of Jemaine Clement and Bret McKenzie of the Flight of the Conchords, she stated: "I have no idea if the writers wrote new songs for the two guys in Flight of the Conchords to sing [...] but the songs they sang were pretty weak." Similarly, VanDerWerff was critical of the guest appearances of Michele, Riley, and Monteith, and stated: "Bringing in the Glee kids to sing a take on "Good Vibrations" that was, frankly, awful mostly just felt like an attempt to have guest stars in nothing parts so they could be promoted.

In contrast, Brad Trechak of TV Squad felt that the "Elementary School Musical" was an enjoyable start to the twenty-second season of the series, and retorted that the appearances of Clement and McKenzie was the highlight of the episode.

Similarly, Eric Hochberger of TV Fanatic wrote, "We actually loved Bret and Jemaine doing what they do best last night: playing characterized versions of themselves. Unlike the Glee kids, our favorite duo from New Zealand were given decent songs and some pretty great lines." Hochberger gave the episode a 3.5 out of 5 stars.
