= Damion Dietz =

American film director

Damian Dietz
- Born: California, United States
- Education: University of Southern California
- Occupations: Writer and director
- Website: https://www.damiondietz.com

Damion Dietz is an American writer and film director known for his underground/indie films.

== Background ==
In 1990, Dietz appeared as an actor in Welcome Home, Roxy Carmichael, starring Winona Ryder and Jeff Daniels.

A graduate (1992) of the School of Cinematic Arts at the University of Southern California. Dietz' debut feature film Fag Hag (1998), a politically incorrect, low-budget satire for Troma Entertainment, described as "a punk, underground trash cinema classic" (New York Post / Page Six), "a savagely funny, deranged comedy of manners" (Chicago Tribune), and "rollicking, trashy and clever" (Variety) stars Dietz, Stephanie Orff and features Wil Wheaton.

Dietz' subsequent films: Neverland (2003), a surreal and modern retelling of the classic J.M. Barrie play Peter Pan, Beverly Kills (2005), a campy farce about a terrorist cult of failed Hollywood actors, Love Life (2006), a melodrama about the marriage of convenience between a closeted former athlete and his lesbian wife, which premiered at the Frameline Film Festival in San Francisco and was selected as the benefit film for the Human Rights Campaign, and Dog Tags (2008), starring Academy Award nominee Candy Clark.

Dietz is a member of Writers Guild of America, West (WGAw).

== Awards ==
- 2003: Director Damion Dietz won Q Award at Fort Worth Gay and Lesbian International Film Festival for his film Neverland
- 2003: Dietz also won a Jury Award at the Dances With Films festival for the same film

== Filmography ==
=== Director ===
- 1998: Fag Hag (Troma Entertainment)
- 2003: Neverland (Water Bearer Films)
- 2005: Beverly Kills (TLA Releasing)
- 2006: Love Life (Water Bearer Films)
- 2008: Dog Tags (TLA Releasing)
- 2019: Bestie - Bhad Bhabie feat. Kodak Black (music video - Atlantic Records)

=== Writer ===
- 1998: Fag Hag
- 2003: Neverland
- 2005: Beverly Kills
- 2006: Love Life
- 2008: Dog Tags

=== Producer ===
- 1998: Fag Hag (producer)
- 2003: Neverland (producer)
- 2005: Beverly Kills (producer)
- 2006: Love Life (executive producer)

=== Actor ===
- 1990: Welcome Home, Roxy Carmichael as Whipped Cream Boy
- 1998: Fag Hag as Scott 'Bushey' Bushey
