= Bloody Mary (folklore) =

Folklore legend

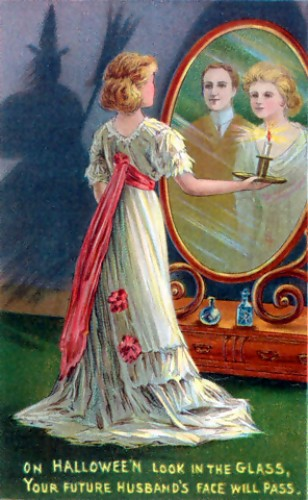
An early 20th-century Halloween greeting card depicts a divination ritual in which a woman stares into a mirror in a darkened room to catch a glimpse of the face of her future husband. The shadow of a witch is cast onto the wall at left.

Bloody Mary is a legend of a ghost, phantom, witch, or spirit conjured to reveal the future. She is said to appear in a mirror when her name is chanted repeatedly. The Bloody Mary apparition may be benevolent or malevolent, depending on historical variations of the legend. Bloody Mary appearances are mostly witnessed in group participation play.

== Ritual ==
Historically, the divination ritual encouraged young women to walk up a flight of stairs backward holding a candle and a hand mirror, in a darkened house. As they gazed into the mirror, they were supposed to glimpse a view of their future husband's face. There was, however, a chance that they would see a skull (or the face of the Grim Reaper) instead, indicating that they were going to die before they would have the chance to marry.

In the modern ritual that began to coalesce in the late 1960s, Bloody Mary allegedly appears to individuals or groups who ritualistically invoke her name in an act of catoptromancy. This is done by repeatedly chanting her name into a mirror placed in a dim or candle-lit room. More modern versions of the ritual are played in a restroom. The name must be uttered 3 times (or some other specified number of times). Some stories suggest you must chant her name into the bathroom mirror 47 times before she will come out. The Bloody Mary apparition allegedly appears as a corpse, witch, and ghost that can either be friendly, evil, or a demonic spirit, and is sometimes seen covered in blood (hence the name). The lore surrounding the ritual states that participants may endure the apparition screaming at them, cursing them, strangling them, stealing their soul, drinking their blood, or scratching their eyes out. Some variations of the ritual call Bloody Mary by a different name—"Hell Mary" and "Mary Worth" are popular examples. The modern legend of Hanako-san in Japan strongly parallels the Bloody Mary mythology.

== Identification ==
There is some debate on the identification of Bloody Mary and if she is based on a real woman. A number of historical figures have been put forward as candidates for "Mary" including Mary I of England (daughter of Henry VIII and Catherine of Aragon), who had around 300 religious Protestant dissenters burned at the stake during her reign, earning her the nickname "Bloody Mary" by her Protestant opponents; and Mary Worth, who has been identified as either a woman who killed slaves escaping the American South via the Underground Railroad or a woman who was burned at the stake during the Witch trials in the early modern period.

== See also ==
- Bloody Mary folklore in popular culture
- List of ghosts
