= Kathleen Robertson =

Canadian actress (born 1973)

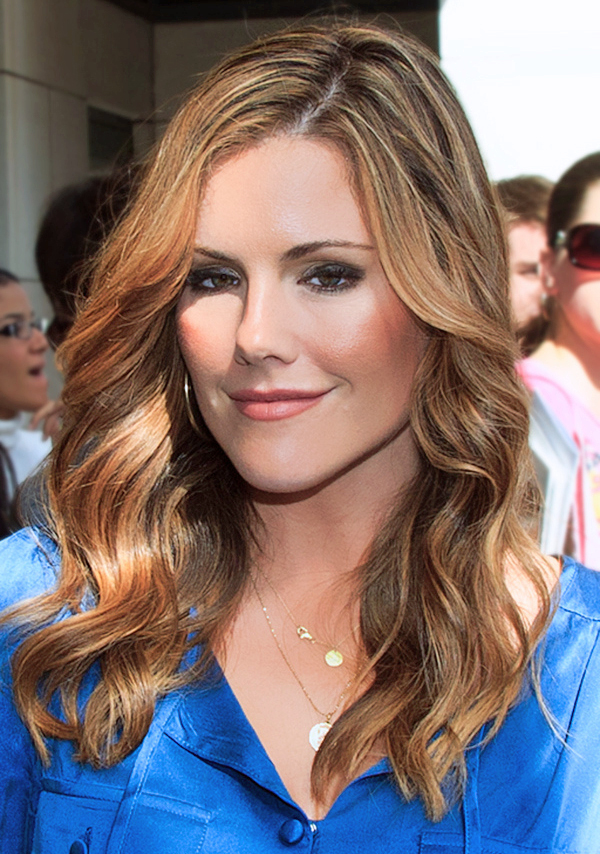
- Robertson in 2010
- Born: July 8, 1973 (age 53); Hamilton, Ontario, Canada
- Occupation: Actress
- Years active: 1985–present
- Spouse: Chris Cowles (m. 2004)
- Children: 2

Kathleen Robertson (born July 8, 1973) is a Canadian actress. She has starred in a number of films, and from 2011 to 2012 played the role of Kitty O'Neill in the Starz political drama series Boss. From 2014 to 2016, Robertson starred as homicide detective Hildy Mulligan in the TNT series Murder in the First. She also played Tina Edison in the Canadian sitcom Maniac Mansion (1990–1993) and Clare Arnold in the Fox teen drama series Beverly Hills, 90210 (1994–1997). In 2019, she played a main character in the series Northern Rescue.

== Early life ==
Robertson was born in Hamilton, Ontario, and attended Sherwood Secondary School and Hillfield Strathallan College, a local private school. She started taking acting classes when she was ten and had roles in local theatre productions. Her first television appearances were in The Campbells, My Secret Identity and E.N.G.

== Career ==
=== Acting ===
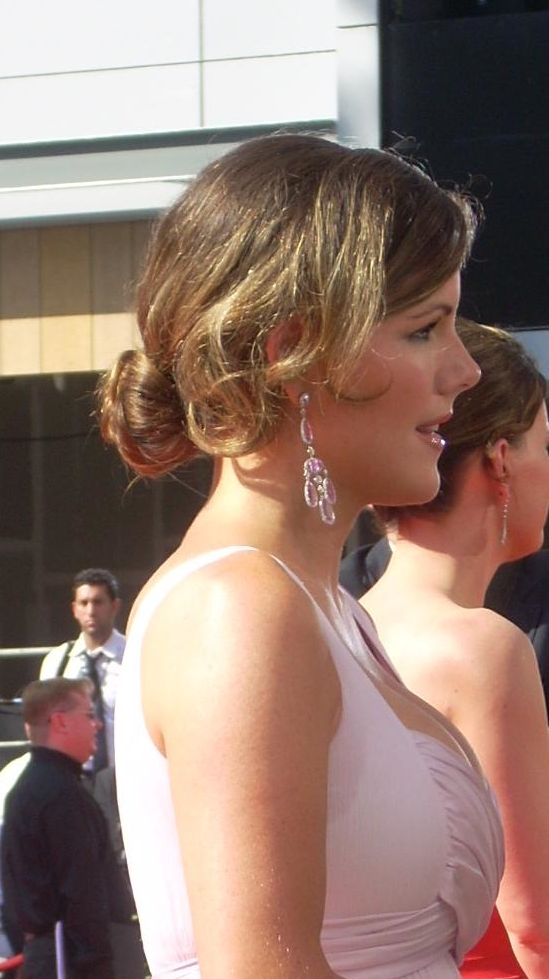
Kathleen Robertson at 2008 Emmy Awards

From 1990 to 1993, Robertson starred as Tina Edison, the eldest of three children of Dr. Fred Edison (Joe Flaherty), on the Canadian sitcom Maniac Mansion. This role earned her two nominations for Young Artist Awards. She appeared in several small films and television shows, and did not debut on the big screen until her small role in the 1992 thriller film Blown Away, opposite Corey Haim and Nicole Eggert. She also made her American debut in the 1992 made-for-television movie, Quiet Killer, co-starring Kate Jackson.

In 1994, Robertson was cast in the series regular role of Clare Arnold in the Fox teen drama Beverly Hills, 90210. She starred in the show from 1994 to 1997, during seasons four to seven. In 1997, her then-boyfriend, director Gregg Araki cast her as Lucifer, one of a group of bored, alienated, and very horny Los Angeles teens in the black comedy drama film Nowhere. She later had a role in his next film, called Splendor (1999). Robertson also appeared opposite Luke Wilson in romantic comedy Dog Park (1998), in Sally Field's directed comedy-drama Beautiful (2000), and in the parody movie Scary Movie 2 (2001). She later had more serious roles with the 2002 acclaimed independent drama film XX/XY, opposite Mark Ruffalo. In the same year, Robertson played the role of Evelyn Dick, a Canadian convicted murderer, whose trial remains the most sensationalized event in Canadian criminal history, in the made-for-television movie, Torso: The Evelyn Dick Story. Robertson was nominated for a Gemini Award for her performance in the film.

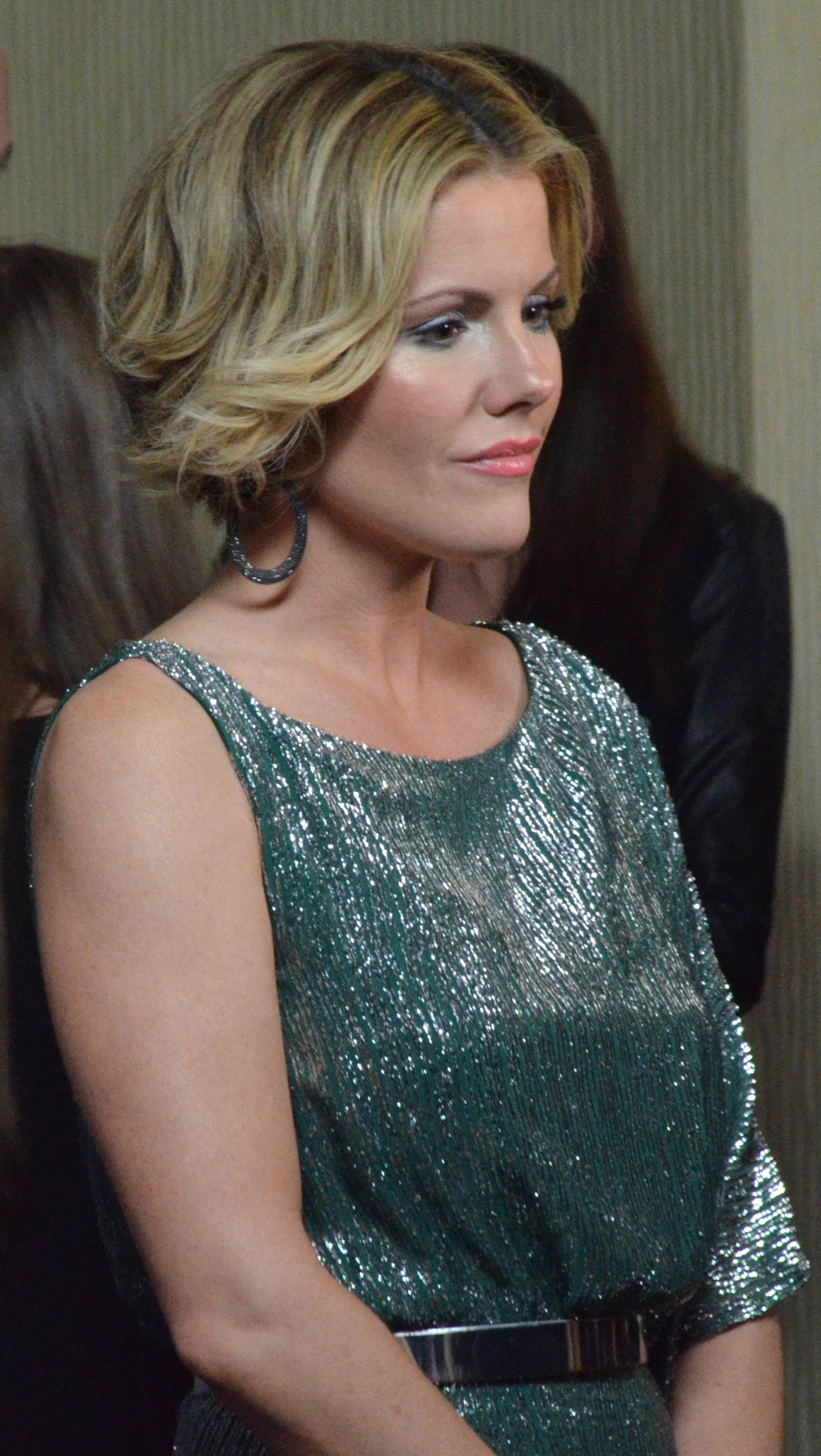
Kathleen Robertson in 2014

In 2002, Robertson starred as one of the leads in the short-lived Fox legal drama series Girls Club created by David E. Kelley. She later appeared in a number of independent films, and had guest-starring roles on Law & Order: Criminal Intent, Medium, CSI: Miami, and Rookie Blue. In 2006, she appeared in Hollywoodland opposite Adrien Brody. From 2006 to 2007, she Executive Produced and had the leading role in the IFC comedy series, The Business. In 2007, she starred in the Syfy miniseries Tin Man as the primary antagonist, a futuristic version of the Wicked Witch of the West.

In 2011, she was cast as Kitty O'Neill, Tom Kane's personal aide alongside Kelsey Grammer in the Starz original drama series Boss. The series was cancelled after two seasons in late 2012. Robertson also starred in a number of made-for-television movies in recent years, primarily for Lifetime network, including Last Exit (2006), and Time of Death (2013). In 2013, Robertson portrayed the wife of hockey legend Gordie Howe in the made-for-television movie, Mr. Hockey: The Gordie Howe Story. The biopic first aired in late April on CBC, and then made its US debut the first week in May. Robertson won a Best Actress Leo Award for her role in the film.

In 2013, Robertson was cast as the lead in the TNT detective drama series Murder in the First co-created by Steven Bochco which debuted on June 9, 2014. She plays the role of Hildy Mulligan, a homicide detective and single mother. In the same year she starred in the thriller film The Vatican Tapes that was released on February 27, 2015, and was cast in recurring role as Jodi Morgan for the second season of A&E drama series Bates Motel. In 2015, Robertson had the leading role alongside Eric Dane in the four-hour miniseries The Fixer.

In 2018, Robertson was cast in the Canadian Broadcasting Corporation and Netflix co-production drama series Northern Rescue. It was released on Netflix and CBC GEM on March 1, 2019. In 2021, Robertson had a pivotal role in the final season of The Expanse as the right hand of Marcos Inaros.

=== Writing ===
In 2010s, Robertson added producing and screenwriting to her resume. In 2015, Robertson completed the Writers Guild's Showrunners Training Program, where she was mentored by former WGA West president John Wells. In 2017 she began adapting The Possibilities, Kaui Hart Hemmings' follow up novel to The Descendants about a grieving Colorado mother whose son was killed in a skiing avalanche and then starts a friendship with a mysterious young girl. She is writing a feature drama film based on Chris Cleave's novel, Little Bee starring Julia Roberts. In 2017, she began developing Swimming with Sharks, a series based on the 1994 Hollywood satire film. The series was set to debut in 2020 on the former Quibi platform. The series was later picked up by The Roku Channel and premiered at South by Southwest in March 2022. She also created comedy-drama pilot Your Time Is Up for Lifetime with Christina Applegate attached to star. As of 2022 Robertson was writing a film for Paramount and Akiva Goldsman for director Johannes Roberts. She also sold a new series to CBC called APRES SKI as well as a show to Lionsgate with Academy Award nominated doc filmmaker Joe Berlinger attached to direct.

== Personal life ==
Robertson dated independent filmmaker Gregg Araki from 1997 to 2000.

Robertson has been married to film producer Chris Cowles since 2004. They run production Debut Content together. She gave birth to their son on July 9, 2008, at Cedars-Sinai Medical Center in Los Angeles.

== Filmography ==
=== Film ===
Year	Title	Role	Notes
1985	Left Out		
1992	Lapse of Memory	Patrick (Melody)	
1992	Liar's Edge	Bobby Swaggart	
1993	Blown Away	Darla Hawkes	
1997	Nowhere	Lucifer	
1998	I Woke Up Early the Day I Died	Ticket Girl	Cameo
1998	Dog Park	Cheryl	
1999	Splendor	Veronica	
2000	Psycho Beach Party	Rhonda	
2000	Beautiful	Wanda Love, Miss Tennessee	
2001	Scary Movie 2	Theo Keyoko	Nominated - Canadian Comedy Award for Best Female Performance
2001	Speaking of Sex	Grace	
2001	I Am Sam	Big Boy Waitress	
2002	XX/XY	Thea	
2003	I Love Your Work	Swoosh Journalist	
2004	Until the Night	Elizabeth	
2004	Control	Eden Ross	
2005	51/50 Mall Cop	Donna	
2006	Hollywoodland	Carol Van Ronkel	
2008	Player 5150	Ali	
2009	Not Since You	Amy Smith	
2010	A Night for Dying Tigers	Jules	
2011	Losing Control	Leslie	
2011	Down the Road Again	Betty-Jo	
2012	Three Days in Havana	Emily	
2012	Seal Team Six: The Raid on Osama Bin Laden	Vivian Hollins	
2015	The Vatican Tapes	Dr. Richards	

=== Television ===
Year	Title	Role	Notes
1986	The Campbells	Dorothea Spencer	Episode: "A Man of Means"
1988	My Secret Identity	Jennifer	Episode: "Grounded"
1990	C.B.C.'s Magic Hour	Cynthia Bundy	Episode: "The Prom"
1990–1993	Maniac Mansion	Tina Edison	Main role Nominated - Young Artist Award for Best Young Actress Co-starring in an Off-Primetime or Cable Series (1991–1992)
1992	Quiet Killer	Sara Dobbs	Television film
1993	Survive the Night	Julie	Television film
1993	The Hidden Room	Anne Morrison	Episode: "Passages"
1994	In the Line of Duty: The Price of Vengeance	Susan Williams	Television film
1994	Heaven Help Us		Episode: "Upstairs, Upstairs"
1994–1997	Beverly Hills, 90210	Clare Arnold	Main role
1995	Burke's Law	Tracy Bird	Episode: "Who Killed the World's Greatest Chef?"
2002	Girls Club	Jeannie Falls	Recurring role
2002	Torso: The Evelyn Dick Story	Evelyn Dick	Television film Nominated - Gemini Award for Best Performance by an Actress in a Leading Role
2003	In the Dark	Rachel Speller	Television film
2005	Law & Order: Criminal Intent	Darla Pearson	Episode: "View from Up Here"
2006	Medium	Diana Marvin / Kathy	Episode: "Ghost in the Machine"
2006	Last Exit	Beth Welland	Television film Nominated - Gemini Award for Best Performance by an Actress in a Leading Role
2006–2007	The Business	Julia Sullivan	Main role Nominated - Gemini Award for Best Ensemble Performance in a Comedy Series (2007)
2007	Tin Man	Azkadellia	Miniseries
2008	The Terrorist Next Door	Nicole	Television film
2008	Glitch	Lee	Television film
2009	Flashpoint	Helen Mitchell	Episode: "Custody"
2010	CSI: Miami	Kayla Pennington	Episode: "Meltdown"
2011	Rookie Blue	Leslie Atkins	Episode: "Best Laid Plans"
2011–2012	Boss	Kitty O'Neill	Main role
2013	Cracked	Erin	Episode: "White Knight"
2013	Mr. Hockey: The Gordie Howe Story	Colleen Howe	Television film
2013	Time of Death	Jordan Price	Television film
2014	Bates Motel	Jodi Morgan	Recurring role
2014–2016	Murder in the First	Hildy Mulligan	Main role Nominated - Golden Maple Award for Best Actress in a TV series broadcast in the U.S. (2015)
2015	The Fixer	Ellie	Miniseries
2019	Northern Rescue	Charlie Anders	Main role
2021–2022	The Expanse	Rosenfeld Guoliang	Main role
2022	Swimming with Sharks	Olive Mace	
2026	Tracker	Maxine	Recurring role
2026	Reacher	Elspeth Sampson	

=== Writing and producing ===
- 2007 – The Business, Executive Producer
- 2022 – Swimming with Sharks, Producer, Executive Producer & Writer
- TBA – Your Time Is Up, Writer
- TBA – Little Bee, Writer
