= Kyle Switzer =

Canadian actor (born 1985)

- Born: October 10, 1985 (age 40); Ottawa, Ontario, Canada
- Years active: 2003-2015

Kyle Switzer (born October 10, 1985) is a Canadian actor. He played Rick Geddes in the TV show 15/Love. He also had a supporting role in the first two episodes of the television comedy/drama Reaper and a recurring role in the new hit show "Being Human" for SYFY.

Switzer appeared in the 2010 film The High Cost of Living, opposite Zach Braff.

== Filmography ==
=== Actor ===
Film credits
Year	Film	Role	Notes
2010	The High Cost of Living	Eli	

Television credits
Year	Show	Role	Notes
2004-2006	15/Love	Rick Geddes	Main character (47 episodes)
2007	Reaper	Kyle Oliver	2 episodes
2015	The Fixer	Tyler	4 episodes
