= Matt MacLennan =

Matt MacLennan is a television writer/producer in both comedy/drama. Matt has also written for film and video games like Tom Clancy's Splinter Cell: Blacklist by Ubisoft.

== Filmography ==
=== Television ===
Year	Show	Credit
2019	Slasher: Solstice	Writer/Consulting Producer
2014–2017	Motive	Writer/Supervising Producer
2014	Rookie Blue	Writer/Supervising Producer
2013–2014	Played	Writer/Co-Executive Producer
2010–2013	Call Me Fitz	Writer/Supervising Producer
2010	The Listener	Writer/Executive Story Editor
2010	Republic of Doyle	Writer/Creative Consultant
2009	Wild Roses	Writer/Co-producer
2008–2009	Degrassi: The Next Generation	Writer
2007–2008	Life With Derek	Writer
2007–2008	Overruled!	Writer
2007	Whistler	Writer/Executive Story Editor
2007	Billable Hours	Writer/Story Editor
2005	Naked Josh	Writer
2004–2006	15/Love	Writer/Executive Story Editor

=== Film ===
Year	Film	Role
2011	Irvine Welsh's Ecstasy	Writer/Story Editor
2006	Fact Is	Writer
2004	Frankly	Writer
