= Last Exit (2006 film) =

- Written by: Russ Cochrane
- Directed by: John Fawcett
- Starring: Kathleen Robertson; Andrea Roth; Noah Bernett; Linden Ashby
- Theme music composer: Mike Shields
- Country of origin: Canada
- Original language: English

Production
- Producers: Daniel Iron; Richard Lalonde
- Cinematography: Norayr Kasper
- Editor: Brett Sullivan
- Budget: $3.4 million

Original release
- Release: July 9, 2006

Last Exit is a 2006 Canadian thriller-drama television film starring Kathleen Robertson and Andrea Roth. The movie was filmed over the course of four weeks in Montreal.

== Synopsis ==
In a big city, Beth Welland (Robertson) is a divorced woman working as secretary in a law firm having problems with her boss and also financial difficulties to raise her ten-year-old handicapped beloved son, Benji. On the day of Benji's birthday, Beth's life is completely affected when she is cut off in traffic by the executive Diana Burke (Roth) and misses the last exit in a highway, arriving late to her job. Meanwhile, Diana is under pressure, depending on her presentation to an important client to be promoted in the company where she works, but having family problems at home, with her unemployed ex husband, two teenagers and a secret pregnancy. This incident early in the morning together with the stressed situations along their day will entwine and affect their lives and destinies.

== Cast ==
- Kathleen Robertson as Beth Welland
- Andrea Roth as Diana Burke
- Noah Bernett as Benji Welland
- Linden Ashby as Scott Burke
- Vincent Davis as Nathan Burke
- Michelle Taylor as Breanna Burke
- Ben Bass as David
- Cas Anvar as Constable Salam Barakat
- France Viens as Constable Lauren Sharp
- Gianpaolo Venuta as James Moore
- Rachael Crawford as Catherine Vargas
- Kent McQuaid as Daniel
- Bruce Dinsmore as Mr. Rogerson
- Andrew Johnson as Bob McArtle
- Pauline Little as Courier Clerk
- Bjanka Murgel as Melina

== Reception ==
Stephane Lefebvre won an ACTRA Award for outstanding stunt performance. The film was nominated for three Gemini Awards.
