= Splendor (1999 film) =

1999 film by Gregg Araki

- Theatrical release poster
- Directed by: Gregg Araki
- Written by: Gregg Araki
- Produced by: Damian Jones; Graham Broadbent; Gregg Araki
- Starring: Kathleen Robertson; Johnathon Schaech; Matt Keeslar; Kelly Macdonald; Eric Mabius
- Cinematography: Jim Fealy
- Edited by: Gregg Araki; Tatiana S. Riegel
- Music by: Daniel Licht
- Production companies: Desperate Pictures; Dragon Pictures; Summit Entertainment; Newmarket Capital Group
- Distributed by: Samuel Goldwyn Films (United States); Fox Pathé Home Entertainment (United Kingdom)
- Release dates: January 29, 1999 (Sundance); September 17, 1999 (New York City); October 1, 1999 (Los Angeles)
- Running time: 92 minutes
- Countries: United States; United Kingdom
- Language: English
- Box office: $284,119

Splendor is a 1999 romantic comedy film written and directed by Gregg Araki and starring Kathleen Robertson, Johnathon Schaech, and Matt Keeslar. The film deals with a three-way relationship between the three leads.

== Plot ==
In Los Angeles, Veronica is a 22-year-old struggling actress from a small town who is looking to restart her dating life after a year-long dry spell. Attending a Halloween party at a nightclub with her best friend Mike, Veronica meets and becomes instantly attracted to two men who are polar opposites: Abel, a sensitive freelance rock critic and aspiring novelist, and Zed, a dim-witted drummer in a punk rock band. As Veronica and Mike head backstage, Abel pursues Veronica romantically, and she gives him her phone number. She then has sex with Zed on the floor of the club bathroom, and the two awaken in bed together the next morning.

Deciding to explore her options, Veronica goes on a date with Abel, and they develop an instant connection. After both men agree to share her, Veronica starts dating Abel and Zed separately. The men are antagonistic to one another when they first meet face-to-face, but after a drunken game of truth or dare, the three of them wind up in bed together. Within weeks, the three are living together in Veronica's small apartment, forming a ménage à trois. Mike is critical of their relationship, though she warms to the concept over time.

At an audition for a role in a television film, Veronica meets Ernest, a charming, wealthy young director who becomes smitten with her. After Ernest treats Veronica to dinner, she finds herself questioning her relationship with the immature and financially irresponsible Abel and Zed. When Veronica unexpectedly becomes pregnant, the three-way relationship becomes strained and she temporarily moves out of the apartment to stay with Mike. In the meantime, Veronica finds comfort in the company of Ernest, who takes her on a weekend getaway to Maui.

After Veronica returns from Maui, Abel and Zed are devastated when she leaves both of them for Ernest, whom she agrees to marry despite not loving. On the wedding day, Veronica breaks down in tears and confides in Mike that she misses Abel and Zed, though she quickly collects herself and proceeds with the wedding. At the urging of Mike, who secretly calls Abel and Zed, the two men rush to stop the wedding, professing their love to Veronica and begging her to give them another chance. Some time later, Veronica has given birth to twin daughters while resuming her relationship with Abel and Zed. When the men ask Veronica who the father of the babies is, she replies, "They're ours."

== Cast ==
- Kathleen Robertson as Veronica
- Johnathon Schaech as Abel
- Matt Keeslar as Zed
- Kelly Macdonald as Mike
- Eric Mabius as Ernest
- Dan Gatto as Mutt
- Linda Kim as Alison
- Audrey Ruttan as the gloved one
- Amy Stevens as Nana Kitty Cat
- Adam Carola as Mike's stupid boss
- Mink Stole as casting director

== Themes ==
Speaking to Filmmaker magazine, Araki referred to the film as being "very much about trying to live by your own rules...about achieving conventional happiness in an unconventional way." In terms of genre, he said "I wanted a sort of Cary Grant stylization. As in screwball comedy, the emotions are real, but there is also a kind of sheen to the performance."

== Reception ==
Splendor received mixed reviews from critics. On the review aggregator website Rotten Tomatoes, 62% of 21 critics' reviews are positive, with an average rating of 5.9/10. Metacritic, which uses a weighted average, assigned the film a score of 52 out of 100, based on 18 critics, indicating "mixed or average" reviews.

The Chicago Reader described it as being "marvelously neutral toward a type of sexual and domestic relationship that's often exploited or overblown", and The Austin Chronicle stated that "there's a genuine, sparky chemistry between the three...and Robertson, particularly, is luminous in her role." The Daily News was less positive, saying that the film "seems more like a vapid sitcom made on a low budget" and summarising it as "meaningless, if perverted, fun." Variety stated that, "though less violent and macabre than all of (Araki's) previous movies, Splendor is not exactly fresh, nor a radical point of departure...a seductively sensual picture that entices while it lasts but evaporates like an air bubble as soon as it is over."

== See also ==
- Design for Living, a 1933 film with a similar premise
