= List of Reaper episodes =

The following is an episode list for the comedy-drama Reaper. The program premiered on September 25, 2007, in the United States on The CW.

== Series overview ==
Season	Episodes	Originally released	
Season	Episodes	First released	Last released
1	18	September 25, 2007	May 20, 2008
2	13	March 3, 2009	May 26, 2009

== Episodes ==
=== Season 1 (2007–2008) ===
No. overall	No. in season	Title	Directed by	Written by	Soul power	Vessel	Original release date	Prod. code
1	1	"Pilot"	Kevin Smith	Michele Fazekas & Tara Butters	Pyrokinesis	Dirt Devil Vacuum	September 25, 2007	101
Sam Oliver is a slacker who still lives with his parents and who is a below-average employee at The WorkBench. He dropped out of college after one month because it made him "sleepy." But the day of his 21st birthday is life-altering, as Sam learns that his parents sold his soul to the Devil before he was born to save his father's life. Now it is his responsibility to recapture souls escaped from Hell with the aid of vessels: magical objects specifically designed for the confinement of a soul. His first assignment is a fireman who enjoys setting fires. Along with his friends Sock and Ben, Sam goes after his first target using his new telekinetic power and a magical Dirt Devil vacuum vessel, while simultaneously trying to kindle a romantic relationship with his co-worker Andi.
2	2	"Charged"	Peter Lauer	Michele Fazekas & Tara Butters	Electricity Manipulation	R/C Monster Truck's Remote Control	October 2, 2007	102
The second soul assigned to Sam is something of a shocker--an energy salesman whose escape from Hell is accompanied by electrical storms across town. But Sam is not too eager to adopt the bounty hunter mantle, instead fleeing from his responsibility, and the vessel (a Daredevil radio-control monster truck). Meanwhile, lying to his mother about his involvement with The Devil is beginning to tax their relationship despite the gift of a brand new hybrid. Eventually, Sam collects the rogue soul with a little motivation from The Devil, and a little help from his friends. And, with the truth revealed to his mother, mother and son decide to say nothing to younger brother, Kyle.
3	3	"All Mine"	Mike Rohl	Jeffrey Vlaming	Transformation (Into Swarm of Insects)(mostly bees)	Defective Toaster	October 9, 2007	103
Sam discovers everything going into his mouth suddenly spawns cockroaches, an interesting hint as to the nature of his next target soul--the jealous lover of an elderly widower. Guess what happened to his wife? Now, the lost soul is a swirling mass of angry insects while Sam and his friends desperately attempt to repair the broken toaster vessel delivered by The Devil. Meanwhile, Sam struggles with encouraging Andi to return to college despite the pain of separation, but perhaps his adventure in the love life of the damned might inspire hope for his own life.
4	4	"Magic"	Ron Underwood	Kevin Murphy	Sword Manipulation	Live White Dove	October 16, 2007	104
Another interesting mission for Sam beginning with random objects of his disappearing and reappearing in odd locations. It is his hint to search for his fourth lost soul in the shape of an arrogant magician working at a nearby carnival, someone who is murdering his "ungrateful" audience with magic tricks. However, Sam is occupied with the prospect of spending a night alone with Andi while driving to Idaho to attend a university concert, and, more specifically, how to dodge The Devil's prohibition of any vacation for his condemned servant. The hunt is suddenly intensified, though, when Andi is unwittingly directed to one of the crazed magician's magic shows, and, although Sam rescues her with the help of his friends and their newly arrived pet--the white dove doubling as a demonic vessel from Hell, Andi is disappointed by his repeated flakiness. In return for his earlier manipulation The Devil finally awards Sam the contract for his soul, but the poor boy is out of luck with Andi.
5	5	"What About Blob?"	Peter Lauer	Thomas Schnauz	Made of Green Slime	Christmas Sweater	October 23, 2007	105
Sam is beginning to worry when wherever he steps, he slips--another unnecessarily inconvenient clue to the identity of his next target, the gentleman being an environmentally bankrupt father of the son who is currently attempting to break into the political realm while defending against accusations of his family's heavy pollution. So, Sam is not only strolling around with tape wrapped about his shoes, carrying the ridiculously ugly wool sweater vessel, and facing smelly sewer patrols for something slimy, but his luck with Andi is out. After the delivery of his contract, and hours of document signing, kept Sam away from their date at the karaoke bar, Andi is dating the gorgeous college success, Greg. The Devil attempts to aid Sam in his dilemma, revealing Greg is dating twins simultaneously, but Sam determines to reveal the truth about his bounty hunting career. The episode ends with the messy capture of the rogue father, while Sam's own father is burning pages of the contract he agreed to translate; and, as for Andi...Andi is upset (probably because of the nasty rumor about Greg dating twins, apparently his sisters, released by Sam himself during a hasty moment). Ah, well.
6	6	"Leon"	Victoria Hochberg	Craig DiGregorio	Transformation of Hands Into Guns(Leon); Monstrous Canine(Butcher)	Snow Globe(Leon) (x2); Meat Thermometer(Butcher)	October 30, 2007	106
The successful apprehension of Leon Czolgosz, the assassin of 25th U.S. President William McKinley, is the satisfying beginning to Sam's day, but it quickly devolves into something less pleasant when the demonic DMV employee, Gladys, is not available to receive the soul (Hell is celebrating Halloween with massive partying). Now, the irritating soul of Leon is speaking through his snow globe vessel, administering therapeutic advice and funny anecdotes to Sam's friend Sock, while Sam himself is ignoring Leon, and Andi is ignoring Sam. The reformed assassin is eventually useful when Sam is given the task of defeating the monstrous soul of The Butcher of Ballard with the meat thermometer vessel, that is, until Leon decides to sentence both Sam and Sock to death rather than return to Hell. The boys pull together, though, capturing The Butcher as well as the rogue soul of Leon at his therapy appointment--several years more in Hell ought to really help his reformation. The day ends with the reconciliation between Andi and Sam, although Sam resigns himself to "friendship" status with his dream girl.
7	7	"Love, Bullets & Blacktop"	James Head	Yolando Lawrence	Regeneration	"Love, Bullets, & Blacktop" 8-Track	November 6, 2007	107
Sam is facing the daredevil couple from Hell, former actors whose passion for dangerous stunts is causing fatal accidents across the state. His hint: the song "Radar Love", something playing whenever Sam is driving; but his friends are less interested in love than lust. An evening out, Sam encounters the lovely bridesmaid Taylor while entertaining the bride at the bachelorette party, exchanging numbers with her, but the following morning Sam is uncertain whether to pursue anything with her despite Taylor's obvious enthusiasm. Meanwhile, the boys manage to capture the soul of Kit, partners with Holly, when luring the couple to the staged sale of an ideal stunt vehicle. Holly escapes, but returns to free her captive lover, cornering the boys at the old meeting place of the damned lovers. However, with a little musical diversion from Ben and Sock, Sam captures his second soul of the day with an 8-Track. Afterword, with earlier encouragement from Andi, Sam and Taylor rendezvous at their original meeting place.
8	8	"The Cop"	Peter Lauer	David Babcock	Tattoo Manipulation	Taser Gun	November 13, 2007	108
Another rogue soul is murdering the persons responsible for his death (not to say it was unwarranted, multiple homicide, court was performing its duty). Now, his escape is accompanied with an unusual show of kindness from The Devil--lobster dinner and an expensive watch for "Employee of the Month", Sam. Sam is suspicious, and rightly so, his watch is in fact the former belonging of his target's first victim, encouraging the attention of the heroic detective who originally caught Sam's target while the fellow was living. Meanwhile, Sock develops an obsession with Gladys, sneaking into her house, only for his obsession to quickly terminate with an erotic dream about her. Sam, then, is debating whether or not to reveal his expensive gift for Andi to her at her birthday while debating with her boyfriend, Greg, about how to celebrate the upcoming event. His internal struggle is distracted, though, by the external struggle between himself, the detective, and the rogue soul. His task finished, Sam finally receives an actual gift from The Devil, a "Get Out of Hell Free" card. The episode ends with Andi breaking it off with Greg, because of his inconsiderate nature, but still refusing Sam's gift, unwilling to accept the implications.
9	9	"Ashes to Ashes"	James Head	Thomas Schnauz	Reanimation through Cremated Ashes	Hairdryer	November 27, 2007	109
Sam is annoyed after The Devil dispatches him to do some plumbing work for a woman named Mimi. After talking to Mimi, Sam realizes she is dating The Devil, although she thinks he is a playboy businessman named Jerry who refuses to settle down. Not only does Sam have to do Mimi's plumbing, he also has to capture a soul that uses the ashes from the bodies he cremated to kill. She introduces Sam to her daughter Cady and he is attracted to her, even though he is worried that she might be The Devil's daughter. Meanwhile, Ben refuses to introduce Sam and Sock to his family, as he doesn't want his grandmother to have his entire family isolate him if/when Sock and Sam embarrass him in front of his grandmother. Sam, Sock and Ben later get Ben's grandmother's respect for "doing God's work."
10	10	"Cash Out"	Stephen Cragg	Yolanda Lawrence	Phasing	Zippo Lighter	December 4, 2007	110
Sam secretly begins dating Cady, even though there's the risk that she may actually be The Devil's daughter. The latest escaped souls are two former bank robbers who have come back to collect the cash they hid after their last heist. Sam, Sock, and Ben capture the souls and find the stolen money, leading to an argument over whether they should spend it or not. The soul Huang almost kills Ben, and both Sock and Sam had to trick the soul into letting Ben free before capturing it. This is the first episode in which the vessel was rejected.
11	11	"Hungry for Fame"	James Head	James Eagan	Cannibalism (His teeth turns into shark teeth when attacks)	Harpoon Gun (x2)	March 13, 2008	111
Sam tries to save an untalented musician (guest star Jamie Kennedy) from selling his soul to The Devil to become a rock star. Meanwhile, Sock is stunned when his mother returns from Las Vegas and announces she got married. He refuses to accept her new husband, so he moves in with Sam, and is thus later kicked out of the house by his mother. In this episode Andi is seen acting jealous about Sam and Cady. Josie and Andi start voicing their suspicions about the three guys' weird behavior (due to their always having to go and hunt down escaped souls from Hell)
12	12	"Unseen"	Michael Robison	Treena Hancock & Melissa Byer	Invisibility	Magic Bullet Blender	March 20, 2008	112
Sock, Sam and Ben move into a Condo together. They meet their new neighbors who invite them over for a home-cooked meal. Though whenever Sam is around Cady, strange things happen to make him re-think his doubts about her being The Devil's daughter. They later find out that their neighbors (Michael Ian Black, Ken Marino) are demons, and they start trying to avoid them, even though they are great neighbors. Cady and Sam decide to take a "break" from each other after Andi confronts Sam about Cady. In this episode, Sam decides to go and capture the soul without The Devil's help, despite being given a pair of glasses that helps him to see the evil that people hide.
13	13	"Acid Queen"	James Head	Alan Cross	Acid Blood	Bubble Blower	March 27, 2008	113
Sam, Sock and Ben go after a soul who, when she was alive, was extremely jealous and would try to destroy any female in her life she deemed prettier than her. Andi confesses her feelings for Sam, and Sam ends up breaking his relationship with Cady for her, at the risk of looking like a jerk. At a date with Sam (who actually was trying to capture the soul there), Andi ends up almost getting killed by the soul and later on in a car crash. The soul almost kills Sam, if it wasn't for the help of Steve, who later gets the acceptance and forgives Sam, Sock and Ben.
14	14	"Rebellion"	Kevin Dowling	Kevin Murphy & Craig DiGregorio	Leech (through tongue) and summon leeches	Bullwhip	April 22, 2008	114
Steve and Tony tell Sam they want to exploit Sam's relationship with The Devil to lure The Devil into a trap where the other demons can then destroy him. Ted asks Sock's permission to ask Josie out on a date. Thinking she'll never say yes, Sock agrees, but when Josie agrees to go out with Ted, Sock decides to win her back, and ends up succeeding. Sam also gets to meet the rebellion.
15	15	"Coming to Grips"	Michael Grossman	Thomas Schnauz & Kevin Etten	Multiplication (Through amputation of body part)	Foldable Scythe	April 29, 2008	115
Andi follows Sam after she hears him talk with Tony about his plans to defeat the devil, and sees Sam behead a soul. Andi confronts Sam about it and, believing that he has killed someone in cold blood, she threatens to go to the cops. Desperate to tell Andi the truth, Sam makes a deal with The Devil. Meanwhile, Ben gets married (guest star Lucy Davis) under strange circumstances, and Tony reappears in his true demon form.
16	16	"Greg, Schmeg"	Jeff Melman	Chris Black & Jeffrey Vlaming	Evil Subconscious, Mind control and Chainsaw	'Get Out of Hell' Card; Nerf Gun (Both meant, but not used)	May 6, 2008	116
Andi's ex-boyfriend Greg reappears on the scene and asks Andi out on a date. Greg has sold his soul to The Devil in order to win back his one true love. Sam nearly gets his head taken off by a supposed escaped soul (Leatherface from Texas Chainsaw Massacre) and gets no help from The Devil regarding who the soul is or how to capture it. He takes his problem to Gladys, who then takes Sam and Sock to a self-storage facility to meet Denis, a demon friend of hers. Denis first refuses to help but when he learns that Sam's parents sold his soul, he feels for him and gives him a homemade vessel to help capture the soul. It later turns out that the "soul" is actually Greg's manifestation of his anger due to the Devil's deal. Sam confronts Greg and Sock knocks him out, temporarily destroying the alter ego. In the end, Sam uses his "Get Out Of Hell Free" card, given to him by The Devil in "The Cop" episode to restore Greg to his original state by releasing Greg from the deal.
17	17	"The Leak"	John Fortenberry	Chris Dingess	Seduction (The soul steals the "love" of the couples he attacks)	Polaroid Camera (x3)	May 13, 2008	117
After Sam turns in a soul who somehow keeps returning to Earth, The Devil tells him that there is a leak in Hell and to find out who is responsible. Sara and Ben fail their interview with the Immigration officer. Sara tricks Ben into giving her money to bribe the officer and runs away with his money. Sam, Sock and Andi think that Gladys is dead when the soul stabs her with a knife, but Tony proves them wrong. The Devil finds out who the leak is and transports her back to Hell. Andi thinks it is unfair that Sam's parents sold his soul, so Andi asks Tony to look over his "contract" and he discovers that every page linking Sam with his dad is ripped out. This allows them to give the conclusion that Sam is The Devil's son.
18	18	"Cancun"	Stephen Cragg	Michele Fazekas, Tara Butters & Tom Spezialy	Precognition/Tarot Card Manipulation	Baseball	May 20, 2008	118
The demons target Sam when they consider that they may not be able to stop The Devil, but they can hurt Sam, who they believe to be The Devil's son. Sam thinks he is seeing Steve everywhere. Sock falls for a female demon – a succubus – who feeds off human life and whenever she kisses him, he gets a rush of energy but loses a year of his life. The soul tells Sam that The Devil and his father are lying to him about his birth, leading him to find out that he may be The Devil's son. Tony and the demons attempt to lock them up, but Steve appears and changes Tony's mind to save Sam, leaving Mr. Oliver behind. In the final scene, Mrs. Oliver is seen digging in the darkness at Mr. Oliver's "grave". After a few moments of digging, the voice of Mr. Oliver asking "what took you so long?" is heard.

=== Season 2 (2009) ===
No. overall	No. in season	Title	Directed by	Written by	Soul power	Vessel	Original release date	Prod. code
19	1	"Episode IV: A New Hope"	Stephen Cragg	Craig DiGregorio	Violence	Cattle prod	March 3, 2009	201
Sam and the boys return from a road trip and discover that they have been fired from their jobs and evicted from their apartment. Meanwhile, Andi refuses to patch things up with Sam, and the Devil returns with a new assignment. Sam must capture 20, then later 40, souls – all of whom are extremely violent. Sock and the guys move back in his mother's house, looked after by his new step sister, to whom Sock is very attracted. The devil tells Sam that he is nothing special and all his children have failed him in his hope of bringing chaos to earth. Sam douses the souls with water and sends electricity through it, thereby electrocuting them back to hell. The Devil takes back his statement at the end of the episode. Sam asks for Andi's help in looking for an escaped soul, who somehow broke his deal with the devil after escaping, so they can have a relationship.
20	2	"Dirty Sexy Mongol"	Ron Underwood	Kevin Etten	Adaptation	Spear	March 10, 2009	202
Sam's been given a new assignment from the Devil to capture a Mongol, but all he can focus on is finding out how Alan Townsend (guest star Sean Patrick Thomas) got out of his deal with the Devil. However, after Sam and Alan are attacked by two demons sent by the Devil, Alan refuses to talk to him any more and disappears. One of the demons takes a surprising interest in Ben. Ted is fired for harassing a secret shopper.
21	3	"The Sweet Science"	Tom Cherones	Chris Dingess	Boxing Strength	Boxing gloves	March 17, 2009	203
Ben starts meeting with his demon girlfriend Nina. Sam must capture a former boxer by using boxing gloves as a vessel. Meanwhile, Andi is awarded a promotion at the Work Bench.
22	4	"The Favorite"	Kevin Dowling	Michele Fazekas & Tara Butters	Turning Gold Coins into Golden Bugs	Letter opener	March 24, 2009	204
The Devil orders Sam to teach his spoiled son, Morgan, to have a stronger work ethic so he can take over the family business. Sam reluctantly takes Morgan with him to capture an escaped soul. Meanwhile, Ben believes Nina is turned off by his human form, and Sock uses Ted in a scheme at the Work Bench. Sam later finds out that his dad has come back from the dead.
23	5	"I Want My Baby Back"	John Fortenberry	Thomas Schnauz	Vampire	Wooden Stake	March 31, 2009	206
Sam seeks help after returning an escaped soul to hell, who has left her baby behind; the baby is adopted by the returning Tony who names the baby 'Little Stevie' but the devil orders Sam to take the baby back from Tony. Andi learns that Sam is the Devil's son from Morgan and starts to feel uncomfortable around him.
24	6	"Underbelly"	Stephen Cragg	Jeffrey Vlaming	Tentacle Monster, Metamorphosis (can transform each tentacle into their victims as "bait")	Grenade	April 7, 2009	205
The guys go on a road trip to locate an escaped soul, and they encounter a tentacled beast that is taking over a small town and is eager to dine on them. Meanwhile, Ben tries to give Nina more freedom, and Sock finally sleeps with his stepsister. The episode ends when Andi reveals that Sam's devil life is too much for her, so she breaks up with him.
25	7	"The Good Soil"	Michael Patrick Jann	James Eagan	Make Others Feel Sorry For Him	Dodgeball	April 14, 2009	207
Sam is forced to once again take Morgan on a soul catch, but Morgan takes off, leaving Sam to once again do all the work. Sam and the guys try to help the soul when they find that he is a virgin because he died before having sex. Meanwhile, Nina offers to take Ben flying, and Sam tries to make up with Andi who is being very difficult.
26	8	"The Home Stretch"	Bob Berlinger	Craig DiGregorio & Kevin Etten	Portal to Hell (Main soul); Violence (the other two)	Fire extinguisher (meant) Portal to Hell (used)	April 21, 2009	209
Sam continues on his quest to find Alan, who he believes can help him get out of his contract with the Devil. Elsewhere the devil pits Sam and Morgan against each other to see who will become his heir.
27	9	"No Reaper Left Behind"	Tom Spezialy	Tom Spezialy	Finger Nail Claws; Immortality	Revolver; Nerf Gun	April 28, 2009	210
Sam is sent to the home of the Devil's lover Sally so that she can teach him more of the "family business". He initially refuses, but realizing she can possibly help him out of his contract, Sam asks her to teach him anyway.
28	10	"My Brother's Reaper"	Ron Underwood	Chris Dingess	Greedy	Contract for soul	May 5, 2009	211
Sam is tasked with getting Gary, a spoiled rich guy the Devil wants, to sign a contract selling his soul. Unfortunately, Gary is too clever, and manages to avoid all Sam's attempts to get him to sign on the dotted line.
29	11	"To Sprong, With Love"	Jamie Babbit	Michele Fazekas & Tara Butters	Teleportation	Mallet	May 12, 2009	212
Sam, Sock, and Andi go after their old high school teacher, Mr. Sprong, assuming he is the current soul they are trying to catch. The only problem? Mr. Sprong is still alive, and none too happy when they take him hostage to try to convince him not to press charges. Sock becomes the Work Bench mascot and competes with the Bargain Bench mascot in a mascot brawl.
30	12	"Business Casualty"	Fred Gerber	Marlana Hope & Matt Warshauer	Butchering	Horn	May 19, 2009	213
Sam gets into a confrontation in his new job that ends badly. Sock tries to date a demon who has the ability to be anything she desires.
31	13	"The Devil & Sam Oliver"	Kevin Dowling	Michael Daley	Frog Tongue	Machete	May 26, 2009	214
When Nina returns from Hell with the information Sam needs, he's given a chance to fight for his soul. Ben's grandmother has Nina perform an exorcism. Sam decides to challenge The Devil to a game of quarters, which ends in a draw(meaning Sam loses). Later Andi puts up her soul as collateral so Sam can have a re-match.
