= 15/Love =

Canadian television drama series

- The third season cast
- Created by: Karen Troubetzkoy; Derek Schreyer
- Starring: Laurence Leboeuf; Meaghan Rath; Max Walker; Vadim Schneider; Jaclyn Linetsky; Christian Schrapff; Jemima West; Sarah-Jeanne Labrosse; Kyle Switzer; Charles Powell; Thierry Ashanti; Amanda Crew; Nwamiko Madden
- Opening theme: "Standing All Alone" by Not By Choice
- Composers: Ned Bouhalassa; Joseph Guigui (S3)
- Countries of origin: Canada; France
- No. of seasons: 3
- No. of episodes: 54 (list of episodes)

Production
- Producers: Arnie Gerbart; Olivier Bremond; Pascal Breton
- Cinematography: Valérie Le Gurun
- Editors: Arthur Tarnowski (S1); Benjamin Duffield (S2-3)
- Running time: 30 minutes
- Production companies: Marathon Media; Galafilm; Telefactory (season 1)

Original release
- Network: YTV; France 2 Radio-Canada
- Release: September 6, 2004 – October 16, 2006

15/Love is a Canadian television drama series that revolved around the lives of aspiring young tennis players at the fictional Cascadia Tennis Academy. The show was created by Karen Troubetzkoy and Derek Schreyer. 15/Love premiered on YTV on September 6, 2004, concluding on October 16, 2006, having aired 54 episodes over 3 seasons. The series was filmed in Saint-Césaire, Quebec.

== Series overview ==
The show focuses on the lives of hopeful teenage tennis players as they train at the internationally renowned Cascadia Tennis Academy. In this high-pressure environment, the characters struggle through adolescence and romance while trying to become the world champion tennis stars that they and others think they can be.

== Cast ==
=== Main ===
- Laurence Leboeuf as Cody Myers
- Meaghan Rath as Adena Stiles
- Max Walker as Gary "Squib" Furlong
- Vadim Schneider as Sébastien Dubé (season 1)
  - Phillip Lemaire provides the voice of Sebastien Dube
- Jaclyn Linetsky as Megan O'Connor (season 1)
- Sarah-Jeanne Labrosse as Sunny Capaduca
- Kyle Switzer as Rick Geddes
- Charles Powell as President Harold Bates
- Thierry Ashanti as Coach Artie Gunnerson (season 1)
- Amanda Crew as Tanis McTaggart (seasons 1–2; guest, season 3)
- Nwamiko Madden as Cameron White (seasons 1–2)
- Christian Schrapff as Jesse Siegel (season 3)
- Jemima West as Cassidy Payne (season 3)

Schneider and Linetsky were killed in a car accident on September 8, 2003, on their way to the set of 15/Love in St. Cesaire, Québec. Their deaths were written into the series as their characters were killed in a plane crash on their way home from a tennis tournament in the thirteenth episode.

=== Recurring ===
- David Schaap as Hartley Myers
- Scott Thrun as Coach Skinner (season 2)
- Tyler Hynes as Nate Bates (seasons 2–3)
- Anthony Lemke as Coach Daniel Brock (season 3)

== Episodes ==
=== Season 1 (2004–05) ===
No. overall	No. in season	Title	Directed by	Written by	Original release date
1	1	"Studentia Jockulus"	Paolo Barzman	Derek Schreyer	September 6, 2004
2	2	"The Princess and the Clown"	Paolo Barzman	Derek Schreyer	September 13, 2004
3	3	"The French Deception"	Paolo Barzman	Derek Schreyer	September 20, 2004
4	4	"Midnight Snack Club"	Paolo Barzman	Derek Schreyer	September 27, 2004
5	5	"Reckoning"	Paolo Barzman	Derek Schreyer	October 4, 2004
6	6	"Memphre Blues"	Craig Pryce	Skander Halim	October 11, 2004
7	7	"Scourge of Frankenrival"	Paolo Barzman	Sheri Elwood	October 18, 2004
8	8	"Mixed Up Doubles"	Paolo Barzman	Alex Pugsley	November 1, 2004
9	9	"30/Love"	Craig Pryce	Alex Epstein	November 8, 2004
10	10	"Very Superstitious"	Craig Pryce	Phil Price & Myles Hainsworth	November 15, 2004
11	11	"The Big Adjustment"	Craig Pryce	Alex Pugsley	November 22, 2004
12	12	"Squib Inc."	Paolo Barzman	Skander Halim	November 29, 2004
13	13	"Curve Balls"	Paolo Barzman	Derek Schreyer	January 17, 2005
14	14	"Renewal"	Paolo Barzman	Derek Schreyer	January 17, 2005
15	15	"The Powers That Be"	Paolo Barzman	Matt MacLennan	January 24, 2005
16	16	"The Choice"	Paolo Barzman	Alex Epstein	February 7, 2005
17	17	"Speedy Reputation"	Paolo Barzman	Sheri Elwood	February 14, 2005
18	18	"Racket Strings and Vanity Mirrors"	Graeme Lynch	Michael Leo Donovan	February 21, 2005
19	19	"Love Letters"	Graeme Lynch	Michael Leo Donovan	February 28, 2005
20	20	"King Pong"	Paolo Barzman	Michael Leo Donovan	March 7, 2005
21	21	"Picture Perfect"	Graeme Lynch	Matt MacLennan	March 14, 2005
22	22	"Justin Time"	Paolo Barzman	Michael Leo Donovan	March 21, 2005
23	23	"Eurocrush"	Paolo Barzman	Derek Schreyer	March 30, 2005
24	24	"Ghost of a Chance"	Paolo Barzman	Derek Schreyer	April 6, 2005
25	25	"Cascade"	Graeme Lynch	Karen Troubetzkoy	April 13, 2005
26	26	"The Final Cut"	Graeme Lynch	Derek Schreyer	April 20, 2005

=== Season 2 (2005–06) ===
No. overall	No. in season	Title	Directed by	Written by	Original release date
27	1	"Return of the King"	Paolo Barzman	Derek Schreyer	September 5, 2005
28	2	"Fixed Doubles"	Graeme Lynch	Karen Troubetzkoy	September 12, 2005
29	3	"Every Dog Has Its Day"	Paolo Barzman	Skander Halim	September 19, 2005
30	4	"Fortunate Son"	Paolo Barzman	Alex Pugsley	September 26, 2005
31	5	"Break Point"	Paolo Barzman	Matt MacLennan	October 3, 2005
32	6	"The Real Dirt"	Paolo Barzman	Sheri Elwood	October 10, 2005
33	7	"Anger Management"	Graeme Lynch	Sheri Elwood	October 17, 2005
34	8	"Lord of the Fries"	Paolo Barzman	Derek Schreyer	October 24, 2005
35	9	"About a Girl"	Graeme Lynch	Matt MacLennan	October 31, 2005
36	10	"The Trial"	Sean Dwyer	Derek Schreyer	November 7, 2005
37	11	"The Agent Game"	Paolo Barzman	Sheri Elwood	November 14, 2005
38	12	"Comfort Zone"	Paolo Barzman	Jeffrey Aarles	November 21, 2005
39	13	"Highway 101"	Paolo Barzman	Matt MacLennan	November 28, 2005
40	14	"Volley of the Dolls"	Paolo Barzman	Derek Schreyer	January 16, 2006

=== Season 3 (2006) ===
No. overall	No. in season	Title	Directed by	Written by	Original release date
41	1	"You Can't Go Home"	Paolo Barzman	Derek Schreyer	July 10, 2006
42	2	"Odd Couples"	Paolo Barzman	Skander Halim	July 17, 2006
43	3	"Playing With Matches"	Paolo Barzman	Matt MacLennan	July 24, 2006
44	4	"The Slow Burn"	Paolo Barzman	Karen Troubetzkoy	July 31, 2006
45	5	"Foul Play"	Paolo Barzman	Derek Schreyer	August 14, 2006
46	6	"Between a Brock and a Hard Place"	Paolo Barzman	Peter Mitchell	August 21, 2006
47	7	"Road Trip"	Paolo Barzman	Derek Schreyer	August 28, 2006
48	8	"Over the Line"	Paolo Barzman	Matt MacLennan	September 4, 2006
49	9	"Except It Happened Like This"	Paolo Barzman	Alex Pugsley	September 11, 2006
50	10	"War is an Ugly Thing"	Paolo Barzman	Nikolijne Troubetzkoy	September 18, 2006
51	11	"With Friends Like These"	Craig Pryce	Nikolijne Troubetzkoy & Jeffrey Aarles	September 25, 2006
52	12	"Lucas in the Sky"	Craig Pryce	Karen Troubetzkoy	October 2, 2006
53	13	"The Man Without an Ace"	Craig Pryce	Matt MacLennan	October 9, 2006
54	14	"Charity of Fire"	Craig Pryce	Derek Schreyer	October 16, 2006

== Broadcast ==
The series was broadcast on YTV in Canada. In the United States, the show is now streaming on Tubi and The Roku Channel.
