= Swimming with Sharks (TV series) =

American television series

- Genre: Psychological drama
- Created by: Kathleen Robertson
- Based on: Swimming with Sharks by George Huang
- Written by: Kathleen Robertson
- Directed by: Tucker Gates
- Starring: Kiernan Shipka; Diane Kruger
- Composer: Samuel Lucas
- Country of origin: United States
- Original language: English
- No. of episodes: 6

Production
- Executive producers: Chris Cowles; Jay Cohen; Stephen Israel; Dana Brunetti; Elizabeth Destro; Kathleen Robertson
- Producer: David Grace
- Cinematography: Brian Burgoyne
- Running time: 30 minutes
- Production companies: Debut Content; Lionsgate Television

Original release
- Network: The Roku Channel
- Release: April 15, 2022

Swimming with Sharks is an American psychological drama television series starring Kiernan Shipka and Diane Kruger inspired by the 1994 film of the same name. The series premiered at the SXSW Film Festival and was named one of the "10 to watch" by Variety. The series premiered in the US on April 15, 2022 on The Roku Channel and internationally on Amazon Prime Video.

== Premise ==
The series follows a young female assistant at the center of a studio filled with manipulators and schemers, none of whom know she is poised to outwit them all.

== Cast ==
- Kiernan Shipka as Lou Simms
- Diane Kruger as Joyce Holt
- Donald Sutherland as Redmond Isaacson
- Thomas Dekker as Travis
- Finn Jones as Marty Bruhl
- Erika Alexander as Meredith Lockheart
- Ross Butler as Alex
- Gerardo Celasco as Miles Bresson
- Kathleen Robertson as Olive Mace

== Episodes ==
No.	Title	Directed by	Written by	Original release date	U.S. viewers (millions)
1	"Chapter One"	Tucker Gates	Kathleen Robertson	April 15, 2022	N/A
Lou Simms (Kiernan Shipka) joins as a new intern at the office of Joyce Holt (Diane Kruger), the CEO of Fountain Studios. Joyce meets Meredith Lockhart (Erika Alexander) at her office trying to convince her to sell the movie rights of her books “Wanderlust Chronicles” but she appears reluctant. Joyce then asks her assistants, Travis (Thomas Dekker) and Alex (Ross Butler) to do everything to get a deal with Meredith; meanwhile Meredith seems to be in talks with another studio over the book rights. Lou bonds with Marty (Finn Jones), the VP of the studio on her first day at office. Joyce meets with her ailing mentor and studio chairman Redmond (Donald Sutherland) who is not happy with Joyce’s investment plans. In flashbacks, Lou's mother promises a young Lou that they will move to Hollywood someday. Lou follows Meredith to a bar washroom and seduces her to have sex; meanwhile Joyce, who is married to artist Miles (Gerardo Celasco), drives to meet a young guy and they have sex in her car. In flashbacks, Lou who appears to be in a rehabilitation center watches a motivational speech by Joyce; in the present she has wall clippings of photographs and articles related to Joyce, hinting at her obsession with Joyce.
2	"Chapter Two"	Tucker Gates	Kathleen Robertson	April 15, 2022	N/A
Meredith has finally decided to sell the book rights to Joyce. Marty invites Lou to a movie premiere, but later Travis fires Lou. Joyce and Miles who are trying to conceive a baby struggle during sex. Meredith calls Joyce thanking her for sending Lou informing her about their encounter at the bar; Joyce ask Travis to bring back Lou. Redmond makes Joyce finger his mistress as a dying wish in exchange of promoting her; he later backtracks informing that he is regaining his health and is well aware of her expansion plans, warning her against going against his back. Lou accompanies Marty to the premiere party where she meets Miles, who asks her to go sailing together; later she seduces Marty. Lou is asked by Joyce to find Alex who is missing from the office. Lou finds him drowned in a swimming pool at his home.
3	"Chapter Three"	Tucker Gates	Kathleen Robertson	April 15, 2022	N/A
Travis informs Lou that according to toxicology report several drugs were found in Alex's system. Joyce and Marty meet Redmond, who is not happy with the budgeting of Meredith's movie. Joyce gets an embryo implant; meanwhile, during Joyce's absence, Lou asks Miles to go to sailing and visits him at his house, where she steals Joyce's underwear. Travis searches for Lou on the internet and social media without much success. He calls her previous work references but they deny employing her. Later he visits the police and expresses his suspicions about Lou but they downplay it. Lou and Marty go to watch a movie together at the Hollywood Forever Cemetery where they also encounter Miles and his friend Drea. Miles and Lou pretend not to know each other. Joyce accompanies Miles to his opening show; she notices a text accompanied with a nude on his phone which was apparently sent by Lou. Miles notices Lou at the show and confronts her; meanwhile Joyce suffers a miscarriage.
4	"Chapter Four"	Tucker Gates	Kathleen Robertson	April 15, 2022	N/A
Lou and Joyce drive to a beach house ignoring texts and calls from Miles and Marty; they spend the next day drinking and doing drugs and later engage in a threesome with a guy from a dating app. Joyce and Miles fight over Joyce's refusal for adoption. Joyce and Lou go to the set of Meredith's movie; meanwhile Redmond calls Joyce threatening to shut down the movie displeased with the interracial casting. Lou blackmails Redmond into not recasting with a recording of his call to Joyce. Travis is fired for mixing up his medications with those for Joyce's dog which almost killed the dog; he grows more suspicious of Lou and threatens to expose her.
5	"Chapter Five"	Tucker Gates	Kathleen Robertson	April 15, 2022	N/A
In a flashback, Lou goes to Alex's house with ice cream doped with drugs; she pushes Alex in the swimming pool and watches him drown. Travis asks a private investigator to dig into Lou's past. While Joyce interviews egg donors, Lou offers to donate her egg for Joyce; finally Joyce gets pregnant. Joyce meets Redmond to discuss reshooting portions of Meredith's movie which he refuses, making Joyce angry; Lou jokingly suggests killing Redmond. Joyce asks Lou to make a reservation for her anniversary; meanwhile Miles has sex with a woman. Lou meets Meredith in place of Joyce to discuss the reshoots; angrily Meredith calls Marty revealing her encounter with Lou at the washroom. The PI informs Travis that Lou is actually April Mach, a former patient of Aldridge Treatment Center who had once had a full mental breakdown. Travis meets Marty informing him about Lou's past and providing evidence of Lou's presence at Alex's house on the night of his death. Marty calls Joyce informing her about Lou; meanwhile Detective Witter from LAPD shows up at Alex's house forcing Lou to escape through the backdoor. Witter finds the wall clippings at Lou's house and she is implicated in the murder of Alex.
6	"Chapter Six"	Tucker Gates	Kathleen Robertson	April 15, 2022	N/A
Lou visits Redmond and tells him that Travis is framing her for murder and is about to inform the media that Redmond once raped Joyce. She asks him to tell Joyce that she is innocent; on refusal Lou stabs Redmond to death. After police find Redmond's body, Lou is seen in CCTV footage from Redmond's house; Detective Witter questions Joyce. In a flashback, Lou's mom takes her own life by slitting her hand in the bathtub. Police find Lou's car at the beach but are unable to locate her. Three months later Lou stalks Joyce at her house while she is having sex with Miles. Joyce and Miles go to the premier of Meredith's movie; Lou is also present there albeit unidentified. When they return home Lou confronts them and ends up shooting Miles in his arm. Joyce asks her to get out of the house before the police arrive; Lou runs out and climbs up the Hollywood Sign preparing to jump.

== Production ==
The show, which is set and filmed in Los Angeles, was originally picked up by Quibi before it went under. The production endured a nearly 8-month COVID-19 pandemic shutdown.

== Reception ==
On Rotten Tomatoes, season 1 of the series has a 71% rating with an average score of 6.30 out of 10 based on 14 reviews. The site's critical consensus read: "Swimming with Sharks doesn’t have enough teeth to deliver on its promise of satirical bite, but the water’s warm for viewers who enjoy frothy entertainment." Metacritic, which uses a weighted average, assigned a score of 60 out of 100 based on 7 critics, indicating "mixed or average reviews".
