= Reaper (TV series) =

American comedy television series

- Genre: Supernatural; Comedy; Dark humor
- Created by: Michele Fazekas; Tara Butters
- Starring: Bret Harrison; Tyler Labine; Missy Peregrym; Ray Wise; Rick Gonzalez; Jenny Wade; Valarie Rae Miller; Donavon Stinson; Andrew Airlie
- Country of origin: United States
- Original language: English
- No. of seasons: 2
- No. of episodes: 31 (list of episodes)

Production
- Executive producers: Michele Fazekas; Tara Butters; Tom Spezialy; Mark Gordon; Deborah Spera
- Production locations: Vancouver, British Columbia, Canada
- Running time: 40 - 43 minutes
- Production companies: Dark Baby Productions; The Mark Gordon Company; ABC Studios; Fazekas & Butters

Original release
- Network: The CW
- Release: September 25, 2007 – May 26, 2009

Reaper is an American comedy television series that focuses on Sam Oliver, a "reaper" who works for the Devil by retrieving souls that have escaped from Hell.

The series ran from September 25, 2007, to May 26, 2009, airing on Tuesdays at 8:00 p.m. Eastern/7:00 p.m. Central, on The CW. The series was produced by ABC Studios and The Mark Gordon Company. The rights for the show have been sold to Fox for its broadcast in Asia.

== Premise ==
Sam Oliver (Bret Harrison) lives at home with his parents (Andrew Airlie and Allison Hossack) in the Seattle area. Sam dropped out of college ("It made him sleepy", his Mom explains) and took a dead-end job at the Work Bench, a home-repair superstore. He spent the rest of his time hanging out, playing video games, and pining for his co-worker Andi (Missy Peregrym).

On Sam's 21st birthday, his parents behave very strangely and Sam himself sees hellish visions and experiences odd events. His father eventually claims that many years ago he was very sick, and in return for restoring his health he and his wife promised their firstborn child to the Devil (Ray Wise). Although the couple intended to cheat the Devil by not having children, this plan went awry when Satan persuaded their doctor to lie and tell the couple that they could not conceive in exchange for wiping his gambling debts clean. Sam was born shortly thereafter.

After informing him of his fate, the Devil explains to Sam that he must serve as his bounty hunter (or "Reaper"), tracking down souls that have escaped from Hell and sending them back using his new powers (which include telekinesis) and "vessels," varied objects said to have been hand-made in the bowels of perdition by the iniquitous and the vile. Vessels appear inside a long wooden box sent for Sam to open (with the Italian inscription "Lasciate ogni speranza, voi ch'entrate" ["Abandon all hope, ye who enter here"], as was written on the entrance to Hell in Dante's Inferno), and are specially designed for each job. Examples throughout the series have included a Dirt Devil vacuum cleaner, a Taser gun, and a cigarette lighter.

Although Sam initially balks, Satan tells him that should he refuse, Sam's mother's soul is forfeit. Unwilling to sacrifice his mother and convinced that he is doing good in the world by tracking down evil souls, Sam accepts his fate. With the help of his slacker friends, Sock (Tyler Labine) and Ben (Rick Gonzalez), he begins his new life tracking down the corrupted souls trying to escape their own eternal punishment.

== Development and production ==
Reaper premiered on September 25, 2007 in the United States, airing on Tuesday nights at 9:00PM Eastern/8:00PM Central on the CW, following Beauty and the Geek. The series had a full 18 episode order for the 2007–2008 season, with 13 pre-strike episodes and 5 post-strike episodes.

Reaper stopped airing new episodes after the tenth episode due to the industry-wide 2007-2008 Writers Guild of America strike. It resumed new pre-strike episodes for three weeks on Thursdays in March, and began airing post-strike episodes on April 22, 2008.

On May 12, 2008, Reaper was officially renewed for a 13-episode second and final season which premiered on March 3, 2009.

On May 19, 2009, Reaper was officially canceled by The CW. However, ABC Studios was still in negotiations with CW affiliates to syndicate the show, or sell it to cable.

Tyler Labine who plays Sock posted on his Facebook account that Reaper has officially been canceled and will not be returning.

=== Conception ===
The pilot script which was written by creators/executive producers Michele Fazekas and Tara Butters received a script commitment by The CW in September 2006. Mark Gordon and Deborah Spera also joined the project as executive producers under the former's production banner at Touchstone Television, The Mark Gordon Company. The network green-lighted a pilot order for the script in January 2007, and writer/director Kevin Smith agreed to direct the first hour of the series in February 2007. The CW gave the series an early pick-up and a 13-episode order on May 15, 2007.

While initially not making a full season order, The CW eventually ordered an additional 3 episodes, citing a high percentage of audience retention between Reaper and Beauty and the Geek. Additional episodes were ordered to fill in the first season after the writer's strike was resolved, and a second season of 13 episodes was later ordered, as well.

In a February 1, 2010 interview with CliqueClack TV, creators Fazekas and Butters revealed many of the unresolved plots from the series.

=== Casting ===
Casting began in February 2007, when Bret Harrison won the lead role of Sam Oliver. At the time, his commitment to the series came second to his show at Fox, The Loop, which had yet to air its second season on the network. The show was later canceled, leaving Harrison free to fully concentrate on Reaper. Canadian actor Tyler Labine (formerly of the sci-fi series Invasion) was cast in the same month in the role of Bert "Sock" Wysocki, Sam's best friend and sidekick. Nikki Reed, actress and co-writer of the award-winning film Thirteen, was originally cast as Sam's love interest, Andi, in March 2007 but she was replaced by Missy Peregrym, who was fresh off a high-profile recurring role on Heroes in June 2007. Actors for the roles of Ben (Sam and Sock's co-worker and friend) and Josie (Sock's ex-girlfriend) were found in the same month when Rick Gonzalez and Valarie Rae Miller were cast. Anthony Head and James Marsters auditioned for the role of the devil before Ray Wise was cast in the part in mid-March. Kyle Switzer was cast as Sam's younger brother Keith. Keith's name would later be changed to Kyle, and was written out of the show after two episodes. Donovan Stinson and Andrew Airlie rounded out the cast as Ted Gallagher and John Oliver, Sam's boss and father respectively.

In July 2008, it was announced that Eriko Tamura had been cast as a season 2 recurring character, playing Sock's new stepsister and love interest.

=== Broadcast history ===
The first showing of the pilot occurred on July 27, 2007, at San Diego Comic-Con. It received mostly positive responses from critics and audience members alike. The series premiered on The CW on September 25, 2007, and ran on Tuesdays, but moved in late February 2008 to Thursdays after Smallville. After the restart following the writers' strike, Reaper returned to being broadcast on Tuesday nights on The CW as original releases.

=== Cancellation ===
The CW canceled the show near the end of the second season, airing the final episode on May 26, 2009. ABC Studios was initially in talks with CW affiliates to get a syndicated version of Reaper run on Sunday nights.

It was later reported that syndication talks with CW affiliates fell through, as well as attempts to sell the series to Sci-Fi Channel as part of its change over to Syfy, after news that both Bret Harrison ("Sam") and Tyler Labine ("Sock") would not be returning for season three even if the syndication plan proved viable.

The official Reaper website confirmed that there will be no third season, but there will be a comic book series and possibly a cartoon.

In February 2018, Bret Harrison and Tyler Labine reprised their roles from the show on episode 14 of Kevin (Probably) Saves the World.

=== Syndication ===
In 2013, FEARnet made a syndication deal to air the entire series. It is FEARnet's first "off-network" series, meaning that it is the first third-party show they air that they didn't make for the network. The series premiered on June 4, 2013, but on May 28, FEARnet aired a 30-minute reunion special that they produced which featured discussion with some of the cast. During the reunion cast members left open the possibility that a Kickstarter campaign could help finance the production of a season 3 of Reaper.

== Cast and characters ==
=== Main characters ===
==== Samuel "Sam" Oliver ====
Sam Oliver (played by Bret Harrison), the protagonist of the show, is a dropout and all-around slacker who, due to a deal that his parents made to save his father's life, is coerced into becoming a bounty hunter for the Devil after turning 21 years old. According to the terms of the contract, Sam would serve the Devil by using various tools, called vessels, to recapture souls who have escaped from Hell. After capturing an escaped soul with a vessel, he would then drop the vessel and soul at a portal to Hell, which was the local Department of Motor Vehicles in the show. Also, the Devil would grant Sam a unique power to aid in a particular soul's capture; the type of power ranged from telekinesis to a tattoo hinting the soul's location.

Sam, despite being an inherent quitter, surrendered to his fate as a bounty hunter for the Devil in an endeavor to prevent the escaped souls from endangering innocent lives and to protect his mother's soul. He enlists the help of his best friends Sock and Ben to capture these dangerous souls.

Since the beginning of the show, Sam had romantic feelings for his co-worker, Andi and the two entered a relationship by the end of the first season.

At the end of season one, the demon Tony tells Sam that he believes Sam's parents were paid by the Devil to carry his (the Devil's) baby, though Sam's mother denied this, and the Devil admits that he would probably not answer Sam honestly if asked about it. Later, the Devil indicates that Sam is his son, although the father who raised Sam, Mr. Oliver, tells Sam that the deal with the Devil will not allow him to tell Sam the truth of the matter. All other characters who know about the claim assume that Sam, though kindhearted, is indeed the Devil's son.

During season 2, Sam discovers an escaped soul, Alan, who can't be sent back to Hell because he claims he escaped the Devil. Sam continues throughout the season hunting down Alan, trying to get information on how to escape his contract.

In "Underbelly", the Devil hints that Sam is invulnerable. In "The Home Stretch," Sam inadvertently wins a competition with his half-brother Morgan and is appointed the Devil's right-hand man. In the words of the Devil, he is "my right-hand man, my human representative in this realm, serving at my side as we create Hell on Earth". In "No Reaper Left Behind", the Devil tells Sam, "I expect you to rise to the heights of political power here on Earth, seize control of the planet, and hasten the Apocalypse".

Andi breaks up with Sam once Morgan gives her the idea that Sam is the son of the Devil. She stated she recognized evil within him, and she couldn't deal with it. Even though she ended the relationship, Andi continues to assist Sam in capturing souls. In "The Devil & Sam Oliver", Andi ends up with him again, united by the fact that both of their souls are owned by the Devil.

In the series finale, Sam gains information that can help him regain his soul. Sam challenges the Devil to a game, but a wingless angel named Steve intentionally breaks Sam's hand causing Sam to lose to the Devil. But at the end of the episode, Steve reveals to the then-dating pair Sam and Andi that he helped Sam by breaking his hand and that he was acting from a higher authority.

==== Bert "Sock" Wysocki ====
The lowest-performing salesperson at the Work Bench, Bert "Sock" Wysocki (played by Tyler Labine) spends most of his time sleeping on the stock shelves, planning his topless home supply store, and other time-wasting activities. He won the Dog of the Month award (the opposite of Employee of the Month) nine months in a row. He also regularly steals supplies from the Work Bench, both to aid Sam in capturing souls and for fun (like making a mechanical bull from paint mixers and lumber). Fortunately, he is braver and more athletic than his slacker personality suggests and often provides the muscle of Sam's group. Sock assists Sam with collecting souls.

Sock lived with his mother for the majority of the first season but had to move out after she remarried in Las Vegas. After being kicked out, he first lives in the Work Bench but then he finds an apartment and forges Sam's and Ben's signatures on the lease and they live there for the rest of the season.

At the start of the show Sock and Josie have just broken their relationship off but they get back together in the 14th episode and break off again in the final episode, with Josie saying that Sock is a bad boyfriend. In the last episode of the first season Sock kisses the succubus Marlena multiple times, losing one year from his life for each kiss (he estimates he has three years left).

At the beginning of the second season, it is revealed that Sock has a beautiful Asian stepsister whom he finds sexually appealing and considers asking out. He continues down this path, even with his new sister continually viewing him as a big brother. Sock eventually manipulates her to have sex with him, which they do in the second-season episode "Underbelly." She leaves for Japan shortly after.

Sock is also one of five characters other than Sam who have captured a soul (the others being Andi, Ben, Mr. Sprong, and Morgan). He captured the blob soul in episode five ("What About Blob") with the sweater vessel, and in the season finale ("Cancun"), he caught the fortune teller soul by throwing the baseball vessel through her car window after the fortune teller tried to run over both Sam and himself. In the first episode of season 2 ("Episode IV: A New Hope"), he captured one of the 40 fight club souls with the cattle prod vessel. In the final episode "The Devil & Sam Oliver," he severs the toad tongue of an escaped soul with a machete and sends it back to Hell.

==== Benjamin "Ben" Gonzalez ====
One of Sam and Sock's co-workers and friends, Benjamin Casper Perez Gonzalez (played by Rick Gonzalez) knows Sam is working for Satan and helps him out. He seems to have a tendency to get hurt when assisting Sam in capturing escaped souls (though this tendency diminished as the series progressed, partially because he doesn't go soul-hunting along with Sam as extensively as Sock does). In the series pilot, he is sent to the hospital by the fire soul and consumed by the blob monster in episode 5 ("What about Blob"), is held hostage in episode 10, ("Cash Out"), and hit by a 2x4 along with his friends while fighting two of the 40 fight club souls (Episode IV A New Hope). However, in "Dirty Sexy Mongol" Ben shows a rare side of bravery by fending off a demon with a tiki torch, thereby saving Sam from the would-be assassin. Ben is initially seen as the brains of the trio as he is usually the one responsible for coming up with tactics and strategies in aiding Sam capture escaped souls and is not above recommending and taking advantage of the Work Bench's merchandise as makeshift hunting gear whenever the three conduct a hunt; he initially sought training as a priest and has extensive knowledge of the Bible, and often raises theological questions about the nature of their missions and the Devil's involvement.

Ben appears far less competent when he agrees to a green card marriage with his British co-worker Sara. He had just given up on his search for the perfect girl, who happens to be independently wealthy, enjoys mixed martial arts, and reads Sue Grafton novels. Once married, Ben immediately meets Cassidy while chasing a soul, and she fits every criterion for his perfect girl. Sara, far crueler and more shrewd than she initially lets on, forbids Ben to see Cassidy, though she has no qualms about her own extramarital affairs that she keeps secret from Ben. Ben is eventually able to negotiate a compromise with Sara after discovering she is pregnant with her married boyfriend Esteban's child.

When Ben's sham marriage is discovered by an INS agent, he is told he is going to jail. He gets money together to pay a fine in lieu of jail time, but Sara tricks him into giving her the money so that she can go on the lam. At the end of the episode "The Leak", Cassidy drives Ben to jail, telling Sock " When this is all over, my boyfriend will no longer be married". Early in the next episode, "Cancun," Ben arrives at the Work Bench disappointed that his friends forgot to pick him up after serving his eight-day sentence. It is revealed later that Cassidy broke up with him during the jail sentence.

Ben is one of five people who have captured a soul for Sam (the others are Morgan, Mr. Sprong, Sock and Andi) - he captured the tentacle soul in episode 24 ("Underbelly") with Sam's grenade vessel.

In season two, he begins dating Nina, a demon. In "The Home Stretch", he breaks up with her at the insistence of his domineering grandmother, but gets back together with her in "No Reaper Left Behind." He has shown that he has grown out of his nature by going against his psychic grandmother in order to remain together with Nina (which means he has gone against his family since his grandmother is in control of the entire family). It was later revealed he only followed his grandmother's orders for the purpose of being left in her will. During the mating season for the demons, Ben fought off a male demon determined to mate with Nina; he did not want any demon to touch Nina.

In "The Favorite", Ben is shown to be the laughing stock of the group as Sam and Sock are always wanting to tease him; Sam's zombie-like father hides in the backseat of Sam's car while Sock and Sam tempt Ben into the car to see the look on his face when he is scared by Sam's father.

==== Andi Prendergast ====
Andi Prendergast (played by Missy Peregrym in the series and Nikki Reed in the unaired pilot) is Sam's girlfriend and for a time, manager. Initially unaware of Sam's Reaper duties, she is let down multiple times when Sam is called away from dates to capture souls. Chancing to see him on duty, Andi watches Sam behead an escaped soul from a distance and initially threatens to go to the police. Sam is warned by the Devil to ensure she remains unaware of his activities, but eventually, he receives permission to let her know what he does. With help from Sam's neighbor (and demon) Tony, as well as from the escaped soul at the time, Sam convinces Andi of his "job". Andi reacts poorly, but eventually accepts Sam's fate and becomes his third assistant in hunting souls, though her assistance seems more focused on research rather than actual confrontation. In season 2, Andi was promoted to manager of the Work Bench when Ted was fired because of harassing a "secret shopper". She was later demoted in "My Brother's Reaper", for allowing the Work Bench to be used for a bachelor party.

Sam and Andi start dating near the end of season one but this ends abruptly in "Underbelly". She can't handle this and believes that evil is brewing within Sam. Although they break up, Andi continues to help Sam on his quest to get out of his deal with the Devil. In the season two finale ("The Devil & Sam Oliver") she declares her love for Sam and offers her soul as a prize in a contest between Sam and the Devil and, after Sam loses the contest, ends up sharing his fate.

Andi is one of five people who have captured a soul for Sam (the others are Ben, Morgan, Mr. Sprong, and Sock) - she captured the multiplying soul in episode 15 ("Coming to Grips") with Sam's scythe vessel.

==== Josie Miller ====
Josie Miller (played by Valarie Rae Miller) is Sock's ex-girlfriend who works at the district attorney's office. Despite her obvious dislike for Sock, Josie remains friendly with Sam and agrees to provide information that helps him track down different souls, unaware of his work for the Devil. However, after Sock used a share of stolen bank loot to buy duplicates of all the stuff lost in a fire at her apartment (which he inadvertently caused), she begins to suspect that something isn't quite on the "up-and-up" with the boys and is even more suspicious and upset when her lost I.D. is used to access the city morgue. Toward the end of season one, Josie got back together (and subsequently broke up again) with Sock, due to his insecurity and his apathetic nature. The character did not appear in the second season.

==== John Oliver ====
John Oliver (played by Andrew Airlie) is Sam's father. Though equally distressed by his son's predicament as his wife, he, in effect, works against Sam for the protection of his family. In one episode, John is seen burning a page from the contract which binds Sam to the devil, to hide information from Sam (which he later admits to in the season finale).

In the season two premiere ("Episode IV: A New Hope"), Sam is confident that the Devil is his true father, not John. After surviving being buried alive at the end of Season 1, John reappears as a zombie. Sam sees him again in "The Favorite" when delivering a freezer to his mother's house. John explains that he cannot die because of the deal with the Devil that cost Sam his soul. As a zombie, he cannot go out in public and needs to be kept cool. His deceased status gives him plenty of free time, which he attempts to spend rekindling his relationship with Sam. At the end of "I Want My Baby Back," John moves into the garage of Sock's parents' house and sleeps in a freezer.

In "No Reaper Left Behind," John attempts to regain some semblance of a normal life through the use of the internet, only to be disappointed. In an effort to find some purpose, he asks Sam to send him to Hell in an attempt to locate Alan Townsend and help Sam get out of his deal. Sam agrees and sends him to Hell with the Nerf gun vessel. John subsequently contacts Sam by cell phone and tells him he's discovered a way for Sam to break the deal, but he's trapped in the third circle of Hell (it is unknown how he got there as the third level is inhabited by the gluttons). Nina goes to Hell to get it and rescue him, but he stays behind, saying he has something important to do.

In the canonical (but yet unmade) season 3, it is revealed that John is in fact Sam's father. John was a demon who made a deal with the Devil to become human. Part of the deal was having his first-born son become a reaper. As a demon, he couldn't die, and therefore, became a zombie.

==== The Devil ====
Smooth-talking and debonair, known as "Jerry Belvedere" to those who have no idea of his true identity, the Devil (played by Ray Wise) claims the rights to Sam's soul thanks to a deal he made with Sam's parents before Sam was even born. Although he knows how it all ends ("God wins"), he is determined to do as much as he can to oppose God until the end. He also convinces Sam that he (Sam) is doing good by clearing the world of the escaped evil souls. Aside from Sam, Morgan, Cady, and Andi at least once, the Devil never appears before any of Sam's friends face-to-face, despite the Devil knowing all about Sock and Ben, and them being aware that they know Sam's secret job of being a reaper for the Devil. In the finale of Season Two Andi sells her soul to the devil in an attempt to free Sam from his own deal.

While firm at times, the Devil has never expressed outright anger, in spite of Sam's frequent complaints, incompetence, and meddling; however, when Sam cheated him out of a deal with another human, the Devil caused all of the surrounding racks in the Work Bench to collapse on Sam out of "disappointment."

The Devil has a variety of supernatural powers, and often teleports an unsuspecting Sam to locations that serve to exemplify whatever subject he wishes to speak with Sam about. He also has a habit of providing Sam "motivation" in catching escaped souls, usually by informing him that someone just died (or is about to die) due mainly to Sam's inaction - a habit which generally gets acceptable results; this habit became less displayed in later episodes however, as Sam is beginning to "adjust" to his infernal fate.

The Devil is nearly indestructible, and scoffs at the idea that he could be contained within a Solomon's cage (which can confine the strongest demon). He also has superhuman strength, having tricked and placed Sam once in a painful arm-hold to interrogate him. However, the Devil can be affected by angelic relics, as he can be killed by the Sword of the Archangel Michael (which he has in safekeeping), and could be "destroyed" if the whole world were to turn to pacifism (as Sam deduced after the Devil's near-annihilation of a demon rebellion as if the Devil couldn't tempt others with sin, he would cease to exist - although the Devil notes that all humanity adopting complete pacifism would be nearly impossible). In addition, the Devil cannot see, hear, or appear within curves or circles, although he can be summoned within a circle. He holds no influence over true love, which may be attributed to his belief that humans are incapable of experiencing it. The Devil also confesses that even though he tried to overthrow God, he still loved Him when Sam asked the Devil about love. He confesses to Sam that God loves us all no matter what we are.

The Devil loves ice cream, but cannot eat it, as it melts as soon as he touches it. This doesn't happen of his own volition but was apparently a curse given upon him by God shortly before he was cast out of Heaven, knowing how much he loves ice cream. It is later revealed that the devil opposes anthropogenic global warming as anyone who dies of it would be considered innocent and not be sent to hell.

The Devil is Sam's father, according to the Devil throughout the second season. He does many things throughout the series that imply this: he never gets truly angry with Sam, he only gets outwardly angry with him one time where he says that he is "a disappointment." He often offers guidance to Sam. Plus, he seems to have an extreme dislike of Sam's father. Throughout the series, he and Sam do things that could be considered 'father-son activities' such as going to hockey games, eating ice cream, and playing baseball together.

In "The Home Stretch" the Devil held a competition between Sam and his half-brother Morgan. Whoever captured a soul would be made his right-hand man. Sam inadvertently won, even though he had intended for Morgan to win since the beginning while saving Morgan's life from the escaped soul.

In "The Devil and Sam Oliver" the Devil is forced to accept a challenge, a game of Quarters, from Sam to win his soul back, and they end in a tie. In the re-match, he is distracted by his face in the mirror and only manages to get one quarter into the shot glass. When Sam's hand is broken by Steve and Sam can't score at all, the Devil wins Andi's soul.

The Devil claims that he changes his suit three times a day, despite all of his suits looking exactly the same.

In the canonical (but yet unmade) season 3, it is revealed that John is actually Sam's father, but was unable to tell anyone as a part of the deal he made to become human.

==== Ted Gallagher ====
Played by Donavon Stinson, Ted was the Work Bench's pompous, imperious manager (and recovering gambling addict) who gave his employees, especially Sam, Andi, Ben, and Sock, a hard time. In episode 20 ("Dirty Sexy Mongol") Ted was fired from his job as manager at the Work Bench after sexually harassing a secret shopper sent from corporate. Corporate appointed Andi as the new store manager. She took pity on Ted and rehired him as a trainee for the Work Bench with Sock as his trainer. When Andi is demoted in "My Brother's Reaper", Ted reclaims his spot as manager.

=== Supporting characters ===
- Gladys (played by Christine Willes) - A demon who works at a DMV office, which actually houses a portal to Hell. Gladys collects the filled vessels from Sam and sends them back to Hell. In "The Leak," when it was revealed that Gladys was the one repeatedly freeing home-wrecking soul Mike Volta from his vessel, the Devil "transferred" her to the "home office." She was later released at Sam's request. She seems to have a sexual interest in humans as well, making overtures to both Sock and Andi. Like all demons, she can project nightmares into human beings, nightmares so convincing that they believe they're real.
- Nina (played by Jenny Wade) - A demon who tried to kill Sam, but her assassination attempt was thwarted by Ben. Enamored by his loyalty to his friend and love for his pet bunny, Nina kidnaps Ben and takes him to her lair. In "The Sweet Science", Nina is introduced to the group as Ben's girlfriend, but Ben remains concerned that Nina is not really interested in him and still trying to kill Sam. Nina reveals to Ben in "The Favorite" that she once had a physical relationship with a fellow demon named Brad. When Ben tries to break up with Nina in a restaurant, she cries tears of acid. She tells how, while she was still an angel, she once fell in love with a human. After her relationship with the human was discovered by God, her human lover died shortly thereafter, explaining her reluctance to get more involved with Ben. In "The Home Stretch", Ben shows his reluctance to introduce Nina to his grandma who has 'the eye' being able to see potential evil. Nina strikes up a pleasant conversation with her about St. Peter but is shocked into her demon form when scared by a barking dog, which sends Ben's grandma into cardiac arrest. Ben later breaks up with Nina at the Work Bench, and Nina declares a vendetta. However, at the end of "No Reaper left Behind" they get back together. Nina subsequently moves in with Ben. Ben's grandmother later threatens to disinherit Ben unless Nina undergoes an exorcism. The exorcism seemingly succeeds, but Nina is in fact unaffected.
- Tony (played by Ken Marino) - Sam's former neighbor, a demon and Steve's widower. Tony was a leader of the anti-Devil rebellion, and was often plotting against the Devil. He helps Sam and his friends in their quest to capture escaped souls. As of the first-season finale, his whereabouts are unknown. It is Tony who tells Sam that he is the son of the Devil. In the Second Season, he reappears and adopts the newborn daughter of an escaped soul, whom he names 'Stevie' after his deceased husband Steve.
- Linda Oliver (played by Allison Hossack) - Sam's guilt-ridden mother. Initially led to believe that Sam refused to do the Devil's work, she now accepts her son's fate, and actively supports him in his everyday life. According to the Devil, her soul is on the line if Sam should decide to quit his "job" as a Reaper. At the end of episode 18 ("Cancun"), she is seen digging up the very much alive John, despite the fact that, when confronted by Sam about John's burial, she claimed to be unaware of both the burial site and the fact that John was still alive. In the second season she doesn't appear, and John admits she blames him for the entire situation and doesn't want anything more to do with him.
- Kristen (played by Eriko Tamura) - Sock's new stepsister who adores Sock for being the older brother she's always wanted and wants to be involved in 'brother/sister' activities with him. These put no end to Sock's frustrations as he's extremely attracted to her and wishes to sleep with her. He eventually manipulates her that they should sleep together in "Underbelly", and as their new relationship began to develop, their parents return home. She leaves to return to Japan in "The Good Soil" after graduating with a degree in hotel management.
- Steve (played by Michael Ian Black) - A deceased former neighbor of Sam, also a demon, and Tony's deceased partner. Prior to his death, Steve was an active part of the rebellion against the Devil. He chose the more passive path of rebellion over Tony's aggressive route, but still stood by him regardless. It is revealed in the first-season finale that Steve is still "alive", and is now an angel (again). Subsequently, other demons follow 'The Way of Steve' in an attempt to emulate his path to Heaven. Steve appears to a human being to convince him to abandon the path to Hell. In "The Devil and Sam Oliver," he works as an unseen guardian angel to a klutzy Work Bench greeter. He appears to Sam and helps him translate symbols necessary to summon the Devil, but apparently misreads them. In the season two finale, when Sam appears ready to win a contest against the Devil, Steve breaks his hand and claims he's acting on orders from Heaven, and earns his wings as a full-fledged angel as a result.
- Morgan (played by Armie Hammer) - He is the son of The Devil, and Sam's (alleged) paternal half brother. He first appears in "The Favorite", where the Devil bails him out of jail using Sam's lottery winnings. He was arrested for stealing a limousine. He drives a silver Maserati, which was a gift from his ex. Morgan is very self-centered and lazy telling Sam that he has no qualms in fighting Sam to the death for The Devil's right hand seat and would wait for him to mess up to get his dad's favor. Since The Devil feels that Morgan is unmotivated, he orders Sam to take Morgan on a reap in the hopes that Sam's good work ethics rub off. While Morgan is and always has been the Devil's favorite of the 2 sons so far introduced (Sam and Morgan) he is growing increasingly unsure of the situation, because while Morgan behaves as the Devil would like, he has little to no desire to work. Sam, in contrast, though he regularly complains and defies the Devil, always "gets the job done." In "The Good Soil," he attempts to bribe Sam with money into capturing a soul and giving him the credit. He takes back his money after Sam turns in the dodgeball vessel with a corpse and later in the episode captures the soul himself with the vessel. In "The Home Stretch", The Devil challenges Sam and Morgan to a contest, in which whoever returned the soul back to Hell would become his right-hand man. When Sam accidentally wins the contest, The Devil takes everything from Morgan, and he swears revenge against Sam. In a rage, Morgan pulls a gun on Sam, but is killed by Nina and other surrounding demons, and sent straight to Hell. The Devil has stated that he is repeatedly crying out Sam's name whilst being tortured.

=== Minor characters ===
- Alan Townsend (played by Sean Patrick Thomas) - The man who reneged on his deal with the Devil. Sam meets Alan first in the Season 2 premiere, "A New Hope," during a reap to capture 40 fighting souls in a warehouse. After being knocked unconscious by Alan, Sam continues his hunt for him in "Dirty Sexy Mongol" and tracks him down to an apartment. He tries to solicit Alan's help, but two demons, sent by The Devil, attack Sam at the gate. Scared that he'll return to Hell, Alan leaves his apartment. Sam and Andi find out that Alan's been trying to stay off The Devil's radar by avoiding all temptation. Alan accepts a job offer as a gravedigger and takes refuge at a cemetery after being informed that the grounds have been consecrated and thus untouchable by the Devil and other demons. Sam and the others corner him at the cemetery and, since Alan was a gambling addict, attempt to bribe him with horse-racing tickets for the information. Alan eventually buys into a trip to Vatican City and tells Sam that he needs to challenge and beat The Devil (Alan beat The Devil in a game of poker). He promises to tell Sam how to make The Devil agree to the challenge after landing. As he is on a plane toward Vatican City, the Devil diverts the plane to Las Vegas and gives him 100 dollars in casino chips. Later, the Devil tells Sam that he took Alan back to Hell after he started gambling again; Alan's deal with the Devil was that if he sinned again he would return to Hell, and gambling was a sin.
- Cady Hansen (played by Jessica Stroup) - Sam's ex-girlfriend, and possible daughter of the Devil. Cady is the daughter of Mimi, the Devil's ex-girlfriend, but her true father is unknown. Although Sam is initially attracted to her, he suspects that she may be the Devil's daughter (a suspicion seemingly put to rest by Sock and Ben in "Cash Out"). Despite his general calm to the situation, Sam's suspicions re-surface later on, due to her reportedly strange behavior around Andi and the manifestation of strange phenomena around her, such as breaking glass spurred by a kiss, and flowers wilting and dying several moments after she has touched them. At the end of "Unseen", Cady, upset by the fact that Sam still has been distant and in her eyes deceitful, goes to New Mexico to stay with her mother and sort things out. If the Devil truly were her biological father as well as Sam's, that would make them paternal half-siblings.
- Taylor (played by Pascale Hutton) - Taylor is Sam's one time fling, she appeared in the episode "Love, Bullets and Blacktop", when Sam is trying to capture the souls of a couple.
- Judy Wysocki (played by Marilyn Norry) - Sock's mom. She went unseen until "Hungry for Fame," when she returned from Las Vegas and announced she had married an Asian cowboy named Morris. Angry that his mother had married without his blessing, Sock ran away from home; when he finally returned, his mother kicked him out of the house, prompting him, Sam, and Ben to move in together.
- Greg (played by Colby Johannson) - Andi's college boyfriend. He initially comes across as caring and sympathetic toward her needs, but it becomes clear that he knows very little about her and is more concerned about himself and his feelings. Greg and Sam end up fighting in "The Cop", and Andi breaks up with him. Broken-hearted, Greg sold his soul to the Devil, and returned (in "Greg, Shmeg") with a newfound influence over Andi. Unfortunately, as a result of his deal with the Devil, his id began physically manifesting itself as a chainsaw-wielding maniac that materializes from his body every time he got angry. Greg eventually realized that no matter what deal he made, Andi would never love him, as the Devil cannot influence true love. Sam used his "Get Out of Hell Free" card to undo Greg's deal.
- Sara (played by Lucy Davis) - Ben's ex-wife, a British national formerly employed at the Work Bench. In "Coming to Grips," after Ben gives up on finding his perfect girl, he agrees to a green card wedding with Sara in exchange for $1,600. Ben eventually meets his perfect girl, Cassidy, later on while chasing a soul, but Sara expects him to live up to their deal and refuses to let him go out with Cassidy. When Ben threatens to report her to immigration, Sara counters by threatening to report him for extorting money from her. Ben considers just giving her the money back, until he discovers that Sock spent it on tickets to the Blue Collar Comedy Tour. In addition to being married to Ben, Sara is also involved with a married Cirque du Soleil performer named Esteban. When Sara reveals she's pregnant with Esteban's child, Ben has the bargaining chip he needs, and Sara eventually lets him date Cassidy. After an immigration officer discovers their ruse, Sara convinces Ben to give her $2,000 to help bribe the officer; in actuality, she takes the money and goes on the lam.
- Cassidy (played by Kandyse McClure) - Ben's ex-girlfriend. She is a nurse at St. Vincent's Hospital who practices jiujitsu and enjoys Sue Grafton novels. Cassidy and Ben met in the maternity ward of St. Vincent's in "Coming to Grips" when Ben was pursuing prolific soul Jack King. After a string of dates in the hospital cafeteria, Cassidy began to ask questions, specifically about Ben's wedding ring; it was at that point that Ben came clean about his green card marriage to Sara. The three of them came to an understanding, although Cassidy would still get a little excited about being Ben's "mistress". When Immigration busted Ben and Sara, Cassidy was the one who took Ben to jail, excited at the prospect that he would be single again when he got out. In "The Sweet Science", Ben explains to Nina that Cassidy ditched him while he was still in jail.
- Kyle Oliver (played by Kyle Switzer) - Sam's younger brother. Much pressure has been put on him by his parents to be successful in life, which he considers unfair compared to them letting Sam slide. Kyle is the one member of the family unaware of Sam's debt to the Devil and does not realize how lucky he was to be born second. It is indicated that he left for college early in the series. He has only appeared in the pilot episode and "Charged" to date.
- Pesi (played by Pesi Daruwalla) - An older customer at the Work Bench, he is first seen in the second-season episode "Dirty Sexy Mongol." Andi subsequently hires him in "The Home Stretch." He seems to enjoy deliberately making inappropriate sexual and offensive comments to his co-workers. He also has criminal connections, offering to sell his co-worker's guns and Pontiacs.

=== Demons ===
Demons, in the Reaper universe, are portrayed as seemingly neutral and non-aggressive (so far) entities who are either in the direct service of the Devil or plotting to overthrow his rule. It was stated that all demons were once angels who "fell" out of their place after joining up with the Devil's attempt to overthrow God and got banished along with him from Heaven.

Demons residing within the mortal realm exhibit the ability to assume near-human forms that enable them to live along with real humans, with the only thing distinguishing them from actual mortals (besides their immortality) being two small horns protruding from their foreheads which can be sanded down to create the complete illusion that they are human; they are also capable of morphing into their true demonic forms, as displayed by Tony, which seem to grant an incredible boost of physical power in the process, and also flight with demonic wings. They are immune to mortal weapons in either form. Types of Demons include standard and succubus.

=== Reapers ===
'Reapers' are beings tasked by the Devil to apprehend souls that have escaped the depths of Hell. Sam became one in the premiere episode of the series. The word was first used in the episode "Acid Queen", which implies that there may be others like him with a similar obligation (or predicament). Currently, it is not exactly known how many Reapers there are, or if all of them are even human. Sam does not like this status but begins to live with this fate, though shows no surprise towards its utterance. It is made clear by the demon Steve that Sam is perhaps the only person on Earth that the Devil talks with face-to-face, which raises suspicion amongst Sam and his friends. This suggestion is later disproved when the Devil introduces Morgan, a young man the Devil claims is his son.

=== Escaped souls ===
These are fugitives from Hell whom the Devil has entrusted Sam to recapture. All of them were once mortals who committed various crimes or sold their souls that ultimately led to their damnation. When they come back to Earth, they are intent on finishing the jobs that they started.

After escaping Hell and returning to the earthly realm, not only do they regain a corporeal body with which to interact with the living world once again, but sometimes also exhibit supernatural powers that often reflect the nature of their crimes or punishments. For example, an arsonist imprisoned in Hell for 50 years being tortured by being burnt every day came back with pyrokinetic powers and could take on the appearance of a humanoid creature made of molten rock. Leon Czolgosz, the assassin of William McKinley, gained the ability to turn his hands into guns. Not all souls come back to Earth with a corporeal body, as seen in "Ashes to Ashes," where the Mortician soul came back as a spirit since his body was cremated.

=== Vessels ===
As the souls that Sam is sent to apprehend have already died once (along with the fact that they have various paranormal abilities), an attempt to capture or even kill them by a mere mortal could prove almost impossible. The Devil provides Sam with vessels to help him do his work. The vessel is usually sent for Sam to open in a wooden box which varies in shape per episode, sometimes inappropriate for the vessel they hold (e.g. a large box contained a Zippo lighter vessel) and it's usually up to Sam to figure out how to use it to capture the escaped soul assigned for him to apprehend since the vessels don't usually come with an instruction manual. All vessels are unique because each of them is intended to capture the escaped soul for whom they were created and intended to confine. The vessel could even be a seemingly living thing (e.g. a live dove).

Vessels often have the appearance of seemingly ordinary day-to-day accessories, and can easily be mistaken for such. Most escaped souls shown in the series seem to be aware whenever a vessel is brought to their presence, especially if that particular vessel is the one intended for their capture, thus alerting them of potentially being sent back to Hell by the one wielding the vessel.

Vessels don't always work for anyone, though several characters in the show other than Sam have used vessels to capture souls. A vessel will only work on the particular soul it is intended for, and has no effect on any other escaped souls. The only known exception is a Nerf gun created by a demon named Dennis (in "Greg, Schmeg"). Although technically a vessel, the Nerf gun can send any person or object to Hell.

In "The Good Soil", it is revealed that vessels can capture other objects besides souls (e.g. a corpse).

=== The Ender ===
Introduced in "The Good Soil", the Ender is the Devil's backup plan. When Sam refused to capture the soul and return it to hell, the Ender was summoned to seek out and destroy the soul. As a result, the soul would be sent to neither heaven nor hell. The Ender took on the form of a cloaked phantom and could destroy anything with one touch. It was never actually confirmed whether the Devil was lying to Sam or the Ender could actually annihilate a soul.

== Season 3 plans ==
In February 2010, the show's creators gave an interview that detailed some of their ideas for season three. Included were plans to have Andi work in the DMV with Gladys and the possibility of bringing in the Archangel Michael, though they had no plans to introduce God as a character. They also revealed the truth about Sam's parentage.

Basically, the whole premise that never actually had the chance to come out was the idea that Dad was a demon, who made a deal with the Devil. He fell in love with Sam's mom and wanted to marry her. So the deal was, fine, you're not a demon anymore. He was never fully human, either, which is why you can't kill him... And this is the reason why Sam is special: Sam is part human, part demon.

== Episodes ==
Season	Episodes	Originally released	
Season	Episodes	First released	Last released
1	18	September 25, 2007	May 20, 2008
2	13	March 3, 2009	May 26, 2009

== DVD releases ==
On November 4, 2008, Lionsgate Home Entertainment (under license from ABC Studios) released season 1 of Reaper on DVD in region 1. On June 9, 2009, season 2 of Reaper was released on DVD.

DVD Name	Release dates			Ep #	Additional Information
DVD Name	Region 1	Region 2	Region 4	Ep #	Additional Information
Reaper: Season 1	November 4, 2008	TBA	TBA	18	The five disc box set includes all 18 episodes. Bonus features include deleted scenes, commentary track on the pilot episode, selections from the season's gag reel. Running Time 800 minutes.
Reaper: Season 2	June 9, 2009	TBA	TBA	13	The four disc box set includes all 13 episodes. Bonus features include "The Devil Made Me Do It" - A Look Back at the Making of Reaper, gag reel, deleted scenes. Running Time 585 minutes.

== Reception ==
The series, as shown on Metacritic, has been dubbed as having "universal acclaim" with a rating of 81 out of 100, out of 27 reviews.

Critics have compared Reaper to the NBC spy comedy Chuck, which follows the story of another seemingly unremarkable, post-adolescent "big box" store employee (in Chuck's case it's a "Buy More") who also leads a secret double-life trying to save the world.

=== Weekly ratings ===
==== Season 1 ====
As of May 12, 2008, Reaper has averaged 2.70 million American-based viewers for each new episode for its first season. Viewing figures from other countries are inconclusive so far.

No.	Episode	Air Date	Timeslot	Rating	Share	18–49 (Rating/Share)	Viewers (m)	Rank (#)
1	"Pilot"	September 25, 2007	Tuesday 9/8c	2.1	3	1.5/3	3.28	85
2	"Charged"	October 2, 2007	Tuesday 9/8c	1.8	3	1.3/3	2.86	93
3	"All Mine"	October 9, 2007	Tuesday 9/8c	1.8	3	1.3/3	2.65	90
4	"Magic"	October 16, 2007	Tuesday 9/8c	2.2	3	1.5/3	3.27	86
5	"What About Blob"	October 23, 2007	Tuesday 9/8c	1.8	3	1.2/3	2.61	88
6	"Leon"	October 30, 2007	Tuesday 9/8c	1.7	3	1.1/3	2.60	89
7	"Love, Bullets and Blacktop"	November 6, 2007	Tuesday 9/8c	1.6	2	1.0/2	2.42	94
8	"The Cop"	November 13, 2007	Tuesday 9/8c	1.6	2	1.2/2	2.46	93
9	"Ashes to Ashes"	November 27, 2007	Tuesday 9/8c	1.5	2	1.1/2	2.26	91
10	"Cash Out"	December 4, 2007	Tuesday 9/8c	1.7	3	1.3/3	2.64	89
11	"Hungry for Fame"	March 13, 2008	Thursday 9/8c	1.7	3	1.2/3	2.81	88
12	"Unseen"	March 20, 2008	Thursday 9/8c	1.9	3	1.2/3	2.94	79
13	"Acid Queen"	March 27, 2008	Thursday 9/8c	1.8	3	1.2/2	2.76	81
14	"Rebellion"	April 22, 2008	Tuesday 9/8c	1.6	2	1.1/3	2.60	93
15	"Coming to Grips"	April 29, 2008	Tuesday 9/8c	1.7	3	1.1/3	2.51	86
16	"Greg Schmeg"	May 6, 2008	Tuesday 9/8c	1.6	2	1.0/3	2.47	TBA
17	"The Leak"	May 13, 2008	Tuesday 9/8c	1.5	2	0.9/2	1.99	TBA
18	"Cancun"	May 20, 2008	Tuesday 9/8c	1.7	3	1.2/3	2.69	TBA

==== Season 2 ====
Reaper averaged 2.16 million American-based viewers for each new episode for its second season. Viewing figures from other countries are inconclusive so far.

No.	Episode	Air Date	Timeslot	Rating	Share	18–49 (Rating/Share)	Viewers (m)	Rank (#)
19	"A New Hope"	March 3, 2009	Tuesday 8/7c	8.5	9	0.9/2	2.35	TBA
20	"Dirty Sexy Mongol"	March 10, 2009	Tuesday 8/7c	1.4	2	0.8/2	2.17	90
21	"The Sweet Science"	March 17, 2009	Tuesday 8/7c	1.2	2	0.9/3	1.88	TBA
22	"The Favorite"	March 24, 2009	Tuesday 8/7c	9.5	2	1.0/3	2.47	TBA
23	"I Want My Baby Back"	March 31, 2009	Tuesday 8/7c	10.0	3	1.0/3	2.37	TBA
24	"Underbelly"	April 7, 2009	Tuesday 8/7c	0.9	2	0.8/3	2.28	TBA
25	"The Good Soil"	April 14, 2009	Tuesday 8/7c	0.9	3	0.9/2	2.05	TBA
26	"The Home Stretch"	April 21, 2009	Tuesday 8/7c	1.0	3	0.9/3	2.45	TBA
27	"No Reaper Left Behind"	April 28, 2009	Tuesday 8/7c	0.7	2	0.6/2	1.82	TBA
28	"My Brother's Reaper"	May 5, 2009	Tuesday 8/7c	1.2	2	0.8/2	2.22	TBA
29	"To Sprong, With Love"	May 12, 2009	Tuesday 8/7c	1.33	2	0.9/3	1.99	TBA
30	"Business Casualty"	May 19, 2009	Tuesday 8/7c	TBA	TBA	TBA	1.79	TBA
31	"The Devil & Sam Oliver"	May 26, 2009	Tuesday 8/7c	TBA	TBA	TBA	2.22	TBA
