= Girls Club (TV series) =

2002 American TV series

- Genre: Legal drama
- Created by: David E. Kelley
- Starring: Gretchen Mol; Kathleen Robertson; Chyler Leigh; Giancarlo Esposito; Sam Jaeger; Donovan Leitch
- Opening theme: "San Francisco (Be Sure to Wear Flowers in Your Hair)" by Laura Dawn
- Country of origin: United States
- Original language: English
- No. of seasons: 1
- No. of episodes: 9

Production
- Executive producer: David E. Kelley
- Running time: 44 minutes
- Production companies: David E. Kelley Productions; 20th Century Fox Television

Original release
- Network: Fox
- Release: October 21 – October 28, 2002

Girls Club is an American television series created by David E. Kelley that was shown on Fox in the United States in October 2002. It is often compared to Ally McBeal, another series created by Kelley, which ended in May 2002.

== Plot ==
Three young female law students share a deep friendship and a desire to leave their mark on the legal system. After graduating, they move to San Francisco, where they find employment at the law firm Myers, Berry, Cherry & Fitch. There, the women attempt to break through the barriers of the male-dominated workforce. Kelley said, "I'm looking to capture both the nerves of a young associate and also the gender politics that go on inside big corporate law firms."

== Cast ==
- Gretchen Mol as Lynne Camden
- Kathleen Robertson as Jeannie Falls
- Chyler Leigh as Sarah Mickle
- Giancarlo Esposito as Nicholas Hahn
- Sam Jaeger as Kevin O'Neil
- Donovan Leitch as Michael Harrod

== Production ==
Fox added Girls Club to its Monday night schedule for Fall 2002 sight-unseen based on the success of creator David E. Kelley's previous series. At the time of its cancellation six of the thirteen episodes ordered had been completed. Only two episodes were broadcast on Fox in the United States and on CH in Canada. FOX Latinoamerica aired the first two episodes on a Wednesday night premiere after heavy promotion, but during commercial breaks they played a clip saying the show was cancelled in the US and would not be back after that night. Episodes were never re-broadcast and the show disappeared from the network after that night.

== Episodes ==
The initial order was for 13 episodes. When the series was cancelled, six episodes were completed and only two had aired.

No.	Title	Directed by	Written by	Original release date	Prod. code	US viewers (millions)
1	"Pilot"	Todd Holland	David E. Kelley	October 21, 2002	1G01 (1AGA01)	5.8
Lynne is nervous about her first criminal trial and proving herself to one of the senior partners. Sarah loses her first client and case to a coworker and then loses her temper in the middle of the office. A senior partner in the firm takes Jeannie under his tutelage and she soon realises his motivations are not so honourable.
2	"Book of Virtues"	Jack Bender	David E. Kelley	October 28, 2002	1G02 (1AGA02)	5.0
When Lynne's client accidentally kills himself while in custody due to an incident of auto-erotic asphyxiation gone wrong she is sued by his family for not disclosing that he confessed an attraction to her. Ignoring the advice of Hahn, Lynne confesses everything in her deposition. Sarah, who is second-chairing the offshore drilling case which she brought to the firm, seeks out the advice of a former congressman who wrote the original legislation on the matter. Jeannie's suspicion of Spencer Lewis continues to manipulate Jeannie under the guise of helping her career by giving her more work, which he will be overseeing.
3	"Secrets and Lies"	Duane Clark	David E. Kelley	Unaired	1G03 (1AGA03)	n/a
Jeannie is overwhelmed when she discovers that Kevin was with his half-sister, Fiona, and that their relationship started in their teens before they knew they were related and that for the most part it is no platonic. Sarah's boyfriend, Michael, announces that he is going to pursue a career as a female impersonator. Lynne brings the girls together after recruiting a case for all three to call their own. This episode was scheduled to air on November 4, 2002.
4	"Sex, Drugs & Being Madonna"	Martha Coolidge	David E. Kelley	Unaired	1G04 (1AGA04)	n/a
Michael overdoses on Viagra. Walton refuses to work on a case with Meredith. This episode was scheduled to air on November 11, 2002.
5	"The Moment"	Peter Ellis	David E. Kelley	Unaired	1G05 (1AGA05)	n/a
Sarah has a court case involving soccer. An elderly client insists upon Jeannie working the case because she is pretty. Fed up with Meredith, Walton decides to quit. This episode was scheduled to air on November 18, 2002.
6	"The Young and the Meatless"	Duane Clark	David E. Kelley	Unaired	1G06 (1AGA06)	n/a
Thanksgiving is coming up. One of the firm's partners is caught by his wife wearing his secretary's bra. A woman is seeking an abortion in the 14th week of pregnancy and her boyfriend is trying to stop her. When Michael decides to go away for the weekend Sarah is sad. This episode was scheduled to air on November 25, 2002.
7	"Thighs Wide Open"	Peter Ellis	David E. Kelley	Unaired	1G07 (1AGA07)	n/a
8	"Triple Header"	Todd Holland	David E. Kelley	Unaired	1G08 (1AGA08)	n/a
9	"Hello, Goodbye"	Jack Bender	David E. Kelley	Unaired	1G09 (1AGA09)	n/a

== Reception ==
The series was consistently the lowest-rated show in the 18–49 demographic in its time slot, behind The WB's Everwood and UPN's Girlfriends. In a mid-season poll of favorite TV shows conducted by the magazine Electronic Media, Girls Club placed as the third worst show of the season.
