= Tin Man (miniseries) =

2007 television miniseries

- Sci Fi Channel promotional poster
- Genre: Adventure; Fantasy; Science Fiction
- Written by: Jill E. Blotevogel; Steven Long Mitchell; Craig W. Van Sickle
- Directed by: Nick Willing
- Starring: Zooey Deschanel; Alan Cumming; Neal McDonough; Raoul Trujillo; Kathleen Robertson; Richard Dreyfuss
- Theme music composer: Simon Boswell
- Country of origin: United States
- Original language: English
- No. of episodes: 3

Production
- Producer: Matthew O'Connor
- Cinematography: Thomas Burstyn
- Editor: Allan Lee
- Running time: 270 minutes

Original release
- Network: Sci Fi Channel
- Release: December 2 – December 4, 2007

Tin Man is a 2007 American television miniseries co-produced by RHI Entertainment and the Sci Fi Channel that was broadcast first in the United States on the Sci Fi Channel in three parts. Starring Zooey Deschanel, Neal McDonough, Alan Cumming, Raoul Trujillo, Kathleen Robertson, and Richard Dreyfuss, the miniseries is a reimagining of the classic 1900 novel The Wonderful Wizard of Oz by L. Frank Baum, with science fiction and additional fantasy elements added. It focuses on the adventures of a small-town waitress named DG who is pulled into a magical realm called the O.Z., ruled by the tyrannical sorceress Azkadellia. Together with her companions Glitch, Raw, and Cain, DG journeys to uncover her memories, find lost connections, and foil Azkadellia's plot to trap the O.Z. in eternal darkness.

Costing $20 million to produce, the first part of the miniseries was the highest-rated program in its time slot, with 6.4 million viewers; the miniseries itself would be the highest-rated miniseries of 2007. It was nominated for nine Emmy awards, winning one, and was also nominated for a Critics' Choice Award. Critics gave it mixed reviews, with some praising the acting, soundtrack, and visual effects, while others found it overly grim and bleak.

== Plot ==
DG is a small-town waitress who feels that she does not fit into her Kansas farm life and has visions of a lavender-eyed woman warning her that a storm is coming. DG's visions are realized when the sorceress Azkadellia, tyrannical ruler of the O.Z. (Outer Zone), sends her Longcoat soldiers through a "travel storm" to kill DG. DG escapes through the storm into the O.Z. and befriends several of its inhabitants: Glitch, who had half of his brain removed by Azkadellia; Wyatt Cain, a former "Tin Man" law enforcer who was locked in an iron suit for years as punishment for opposing Azkadellia; and Raw, a "viewer" whose people have been enslaved by Azkadellia.

DG receives a magical symbol on her palm and learns that her Kansan parents are androids and that her real mother is the lavender-eyed woman of her visions. Visiting the Mystic Man in Central City and continuing on to the Northern Island, the group learns that Glitch was once the advisor to the Queen of the O.Z. and that DG and Azkadellia are actually sisters and the daughters of the Queen. DG remembers that Azkadellia killed her using dark magic when they were children, but their mother revived DG by light magic and gave her secret instructions on how to find the Emerald of the Eclipse, which Azkadellia now seeks. Azkadellia confronts the group with her Longcoats and bat-winged monkey "mobats", capturing DG and Raw. Cain fights the Longcoat captain Zero and learns that his wife and son, whom he thought Zero had killed, are still alive. Zero shoots Cain, sending him falling into a lake of ice.

Glitch rescues and revives Cain, and they journey to Azkadellia's castle to rescue DG. Azkadellia interrogates DG, learning that the Emerald of the Eclipse is protected by the "Gray Gale". The Mystic Man is killed by Azkadellia after advising DG to head south. DG is freed by a small dog who is revealed to be a shapeshifter named Tutor (Blu Mankuma), her childhood teacher who is also nicknamed Toto. DG, Glitch, Raw, and Cain head south with Tutor, not knowing that he is marking their path for Azkadellia's mobats to follow. Along the way, DG rediscovers some of her magical abilities—restoring a withered fruit tree in the fields of the Papay — and Cain discovers his wife's grave. More of DG's memories return in the lake country of Finaqua: As children DG and Azkadellia were very close, but that changed when DG accidentally released the spirit of an ancient, evil witch from a cave. The sisters' magic would have protected them if they stayed together linking hands, but DG fled and the witch possessed Azkadellia. DG realizes that all of the tragedies which have befallen the O.Z. are the result of that mistake she made as a child.

The party heads farther south in search of DG's father Ahamo (Ted Whittall). Tutor's treachery is discovered, but he is allowed to stay with the group in his canine form. In the Realm of the Unwanted, they are led into a trap: Glitch, Raw, and Cain are captured by Zero, but are freed by resistance fighters led by Cain's son Jeb (Andrew Francis). Zero reveals the scope of Azkadellia's plan, which is to use the Emerald of the Eclipse in combination with a machine called the Sun Seeder to lock the O.Z.'s two suns in place behind the moon during an upcoming eclipse, covering the land in permanent darkness. The Sun Seeder had been designed by Glitch during his time as the Queen's adviser, and the removed portion of his brain is being used to control it. Meanwhile, DG meets Ahamo and the two travel by hot air balloon to the hidden mausoleum of the O.Z.'s royal line. DG learns that the Gray Gale is Dorothy Gale, her "greatest great-grandmother" and "the first slipper" to travel to the O.Z. from Earth. She enters Dorothy's tomb, finding herself in a black-and-white representation of her Kansas farm and receiving the Emerald from Dorothy. Azkadellia arrives, capturing both Ahamo and the Emerald and leaving DG trapped in a sarcophagus. DG escapes using magic and is reunited with her friends, and together they infiltrate Azkadellia's fortress as she locks the suns in place. DG clasps hands with Azkadellia, freeing her from the witch's possession just as her companions reverse the Sun Seeder's pulse, destroying the witch. DG and Azkadellia are reunited with their parents as the suns emerge from behind the moon, shedding their light on the O.Z.

== Cast and characters ==
The primary cast of Tin Man. Left to right: Alan Cumming, Zooey Deschanel, Neal McDonough, Raoul Trujillo, and Kathleen Robertson.

- Alan Cumming as Glitch, the former advisor to the Queen of the O.Z. Under his real name of Ambrose, he designed many technological achievements, but when Azkadellia seized power, she stole his designs for a Sun Seeder machine and removed half his brain. Without half his brain, Glitch can barely remember anything, having a completely different personality than Ambrose. The character is analogous to the Scarecrow of The Wonderful Wizard of Oz.
- Zooey Deschanel as DG. DG finds herself in the O.Z. and learns she and Azkadellia are sisters and their mother is the Queen. Rachel Pattee played the young DG. DG is revealed late in the story to be a descendant of Dorothy Gale, whom she was named after.
- Richard Dreyfuss as The Mystic Man, the former ruler of Central City who has been subjugated by Azkadellia through the influence of her magical vapors and reduced to a stage act. He assists DG by directing her to locations which will stir her memories. The character is analogous to the Wizard of Oz.
- Anna Galvin as "Lavender Eyes", the Queen of the O.Z. and mother to DG and Azkadellia. At the start of the mini-series she has been dethroned by Azkadellia and is being kept in a magical prison. Her role is analogous to that of Glinda the Good Witch of the South.
- Blu Mankuma as Tutor, DG's former magic teacher and a shapeshifter who can take the form of a small dog. In this canine form he is referred to as Toto, a reference to the dog of the original Oz stories.
- Neal McDonough as Wyatt Cain, the "Tin Man" of the title. A former law enforcer, called a Tin Man due to police badges being made of tin, he was locked in an iron suit as punishment for opposing Azkadellia. His role is analogous to that of the Tin Woodman.
- Callum Keith Rennie as Zero, the captain of Azkadellia's Longcoat soldiers and the man who imprisoned Cain.
- Kathleen Robertson as Azkadellia. Possessed by an evil witch, she killed her sister DG and overthrew her mother the Queen. The witch and Azkadellia often converse when a plan is needed; however, Az is just being used. Alexia Fast played young Azkadellia in scenes where the character is a child. Azkadellia's role is analogous to that of the Wicked Witch of the West.
- Raoul Trujillo as Raw, one of a race of part-man part-lion telepathic "viewers" who see with their hearts rather than their minds and are enslaved by Azkadellia. He joins DG, Glitch, and Cain in their quest to find the Emerald of the Eclipse. Raw is analogous to the Cowardly Lion. In order to perform this role, Raoul Trujillo endured lengthy sessions to apply make-up and prosthetics.
- Ted Whittall as Ahamo, husband to the Queen and father to DG and Azkadellia. He assists DG in locating the Emerald of the Eclipse. "Ahamo" is "Omaha" spelled backwards, referencing the hometown of the Wizard in the original Oz books.
- Gwynyth Walsh and Kevin McNulty as Emily and Hank, DG's parents from Kansas, who are revealed to be androids from a section of the O.Z. called Milltown. Their roles are analogous to Aunt Em and Uncle Henry.

== Production ==
RHI Entertainment and the Sci Fi Channel spent $20 million in the creation of the Tin Man mini-series, with Robert Halmi, Sr. acting as the lead producer. Sci Fi executive Dave Howe said that the companies felt such classic stories as The Wonderful Wizard of Oz "deserve[d] to be re-imagined for a new generation." The script used for the creation of Tin Man reimagined The Wizard of Oz by creating new characters and adding elements of science fiction, fantasy, and steampunk to the narrative while making many allusions to the original story.

Nick Willing was chosen as the director for the piece. He brought with him his experience in directing the 1999 reimagining of Alice in Wonderland, and said that it was not his intention to have it be The Wizard of Oz. They set out to use the science fiction elements to completely change the story. As Willing speaks about the characters' reflection of the originals, he writes that, "the witch is now running things, Toto is working for her, and Dorothy doesn't even know she's Dorothy."

Writer and executive producer Steven Long Mitchell explains, "The Tin Man is an iconic character ... It's a real throwback in a lot of ways. It's almost an Eastwood character. It's a guy who knows the difference between right and wrong. It's a very iconic Western character. When we made the list, Craig and I, we kept going, 'We need Neal. We need Neal.' He has strength as a man. He is unabashedly a man and unapologetically a man." According to The Washington Post, when "McDonough read the script, though, he immediately saw the opportunity to play Wyatt Cain as 'that iconic Western Gary Cooper, High Noon-ish character.'"

According to the International Herald Tribune, "Wide-eyed or no, Deschanel didn't want to reprise Garland's pigtailed Dorothy in Tin Man. 'That was such an incredible performance that there's no need to repeat it,' she said. 'I wanted to make this role my own.'" In another interview, Deschanel elaborated that when preparing for her role she did not re-watch the 1939 film, because the "whole point was to reinvent it. I wouldn't be interested in just re-making the film because it is such a classic film. I love that film. Plus, it's so great, you don't want to be trying to improve upon perfection." She also avoided watching the musical Wicked. While she may not have wanted to repeat past performances of Dorothy Gale, Deschanel has had an interest in playing the character for much of her life. When asked by TechTelevision, "Did you ever dream in a million years that you would ever play Dorothy in a version of The Wizard of Oz?" Deschanel replied, "I'd hoped. It was always one of my favorite characters since I was two years old."

Actress Kathleen Robertson, who plays the adult Azkadellia, deliberately portrayed the character as a quiet menace, self-restrained rather than gregarious: "It's a very daunting prospect when you're asked to play one of the most iconic film villainesses in history. As opposed to playing Azkadellia archetypal and loud, I played her internal and psychological. She's narcissistic, she has every personality disorder that you can figure." Producer Michael O'Connor commented that "Our Wicked Witch is a little bit different than that in the book, but we think she's a touch more evil and diabolical." He also remarked that Kathleen Robertson brought "the deliciousness of evil to the role." Robertson, production designer Michael Joy, and actor Neal McDonough (who plays Wyatt Cain) have all remarked that Azkadellia's personality informed the scenic design of the O.Z. and the look and feel of her minions, from the costuming of Azkadellia and her Longcoats to the appearance of the mobats. According to Joy, "Azkadellia is in love with power—drugged by power. Everything is in the image of that power." He describes the costumes of the Longcoats as "stormtrooper-meets-leather bar" and the interior decor of Azkadellia's palace as "futuristic for 1930s' fascist realist".

== Release ==
Tin Man initially aired in the United States December 2–4, 2007 as a three-part, four and a half-hour mini-series. It aired in the United Kingdom on Sci Fi's UK channel in three weekly installments beginning May 11, 2008. It was broadcast in two parts in New Zealand from December 9–16, 2008, and in Australia from December 26–27.

It was first released to Region 1 DVD on March 11, 2008, in both a regular release and Collector's Edition. It was released to Region 2 DVD in the United Kingdom on September 8, 2008.

== Reception ==
According to Nielsen Media Research, the first night of the mini-series averaged more than 6.3 million viewers during its timeslot, making it the most-watched telecast in the network's history and the top-rated cable mini-series of 2007. The second part averaged 4.4 million viewers, and the final part had 5.1 million. Tin Man was a Critics' Choice Television Award nominee. It was nominated for nine Primetime Emmy Awards in 2008 including the Outstanding Miniseries category and multiple categories related to films special effects, costuming, editing, and sound editing. Of those nominations, it won only one award, for "Outstanding Makeup for a Miniseries or a Movie (Non-Prosthetic)".

Variety called it a "semi-surreal adaptation of The Wizard of Oz stitched together from bits of The Matrix, Blade Runner, and Snow White to create a brooding fantasy that—understandably given the variety of influences—proves a bit of a mess" and whose "look and action sequences don't fully deliver the goods" to the "target audience of fanboys and their imaginary girlfriends." Tom Shales of The Washington Post called Tin Man a "hopeless opus" whose "pacing is largely funereal"; he said Deschanel's portrayal of DG was "saucy and captivating", complimented the "superb, rousing and romantic musical score by Simon Boswell" and characterized the "junky, clunky look" of the special effects as "fitfully spectacular". USA Today gave the film 2½ stars out of 4, comparing its "bleak, violent, unyieldingly unpleasant revisionist outlook" to the network's reimagined Battlestar Galactica; the review concluded: "Ambitious and intriguing though it may be, Tin Man is simply too long, too grim and too determined to impose a Lord of the Rings universe-saving quest on top of a simpler, gentler story."

== See also ==
- Adaptations of The Wizard of Oz
