= The Fixer (2015 Canadian TV series) =

- Genre: Drama; Suspense; Action
- Directed by: Peter Howitt
- Starring: Eric Dane; Kathleen Robertson
- Country of origin: Canada
- Original language: English
- No. of seasons: 1
- No. of episodes: 4

Production
- Executive producers: Irene Litinsky, Michael Prupas, Gene Stein, Christina O’Shea-Daly
- Producer: Gilles Perreault
- Running time: 45 minutes
- Production company: Muse Entertainment

The Fixer is a Canadian four-part-miniseries.

== Plot ==
The Fixer is about a conspiracy of global proportions. Ellie Molara (Kathleen Robertson) of the US Department of Transportation is working as an investigator on a case that arouses her suspicions. A freighter collided with a rig, followed by a huge oil spill. What initially looks like an accident could have been a deliberate maneuver of a secret organization. At least this is stated by Carter (Eric Dane), who tells of a group of "fixers" who repeatedly initiate disasters and make them look like accidents to influence stock prices. Carter himself was part of this group, but has dropped out and now warns of a possible attack on Washington, D.C., which should be prevented.

== Cast and characters ==
- Eric Dane as Carter
- Kathleen Robertson as Ellie Molara
- Andrew Airlie as Grant
- Kaniehtiio Horn as Chloe
- Kyle Switzer as Tyler
- Yanic Truesdale as Kincaid
