= Gregory Hatanaka =

American film director

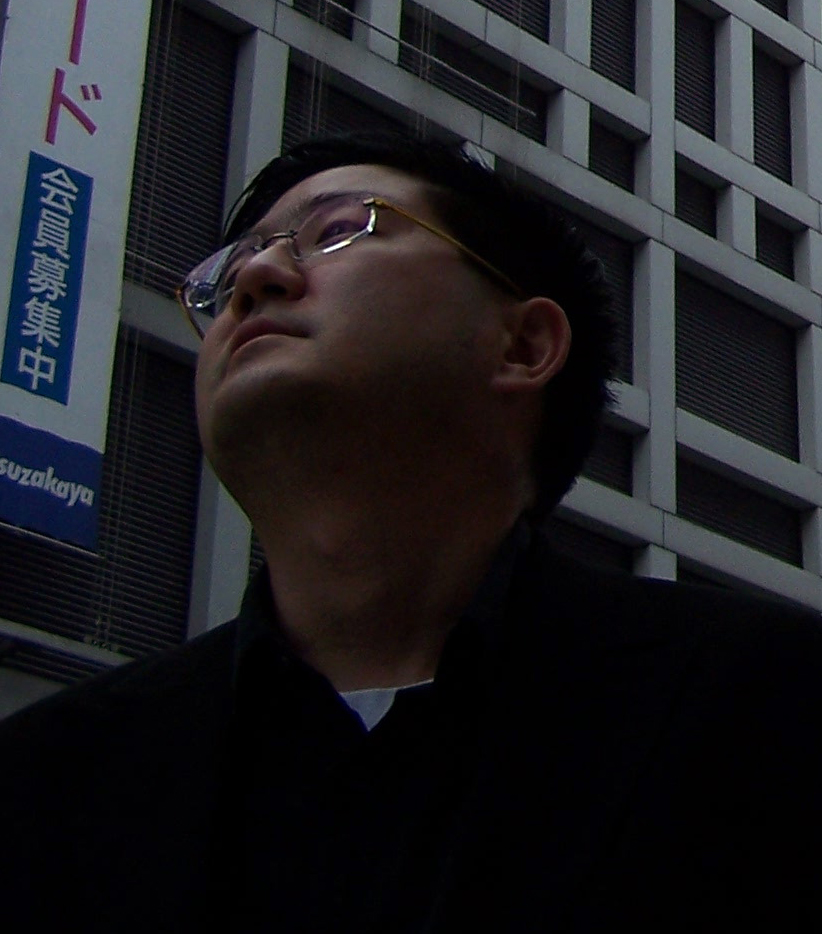
- Hatanaka in 2006
- Occupations: Film distributor, director, writer, producer, cinematographer, editor

Gregory Hatanaka is an American independent filmmaker and film distributor based in Los Angeles, California.

== Career ==
Hatanaka is the founder of film distribution and production company Cinema Epoch and Cineridge Entertainment. He first became involved in film distribution working for Headliner Productions on the re-release of films by director Edward D. Wood, Jr. He founded Phaedra Cinema to distribute international films in the U.S. With a specialization in cult films, Phaedra released such films as Toshimichi Ohkawa's Nobody (1994), Cha Chuen Lee's Once Upon a Time in Triad Society (1996), and Jimmy Wang Yu's Master of the Flying Guillotine (1975) and Toshiharu Ikeda's Evil Dead Trap (1988). Hatanaka has explained the origins of his interest in Asian cult cinema: "I grew up going to the drive-ins, watching Sonny Chiba movies-- I've always had a passion for that."

In 1998, Phaedra films released the two Nikkatsu Roman porno films, Masaru Konuma's Wife to Be Sacrificed (1974) and Noboru Tanaka's A Woman Called Sada Abe (1975) on a theatrical double-bill. The films premiered in San Francisco in June, opening to very favorable reviews. The films premiered on October 30, 1998 and then played for a week at the Monica 4-Plex theater in Los Angeles.

Hatanaka's directing credits include Until the Night (2004) starring Norman Reedus, the award-winning film Mad Cowgirl (2006), and Samurai Cop 2: Deadly Vengeance (2015). He collaborated with the distribution company Circle Releasing on the release of the John Woo film The Killer (1989) under the guidance of crime novelist George Pelecanos. His subsequent films were Violent Blue (2011) and Blue Dream (2013). He distributed the film The Terrorist (1997) by Santosh Sivan, which was presented by John Malkovich.

Hatanaka has distributed the works of filmmakers and directors including Satyajit Ray, Claude Chabrol, André Téchiné, and Leni Riefenstahl, as well as films with such award-winning actors as Catherine Deneuve, Ewan McGregor, Billy Bob Thornton, Vince Vaughn, Colin Firth, Bridget Fonda, Isabelle Adjani, Catherine Zeta-Jones, Isabelle Huppert, and Gérard Depardieu.

== Filmography ==
=== As director ===
- Until the Night (2004)
- Mad Cowgirl (2006)
- Violent Blue (2011)
- Blue Dream (2013)
- Hunter (2015)
- Samurai Cop 2: Deadly Vengeance (2015)
- Darling Nikki (2016)
- Choke (2020) - not to be confused with the 2008 movie of the same name which was based on the novel by Chuck Pahlaniuk
- Heartbeat (2020)

=== As distributor ===
- Agantuk by Satyajit Ray
- A Woman Called Sada Abe by Noboru Tanaka starring Junko Miyashita
- Black Cat by Stephen Shin
- Blood Tea and Red String by Christiane Cegavske
- Blue Juice by Carl Prechezer
- Butterfly by Matt Cimber
- Fever Pitch by Nick Hornby
- Girl Lost by Robin Bain
- Gozu by Takashi Miike
- La Séparation by Christian Vincent
- L'Ennui by Cédric Kahn
- Les biches by Claude Chabrol
- Life Tastes Good by Philip Kan Gotanda
- Master of the Flying Guillotine by Jimmy Wang Yu
- Mikres Aphrodites by Nikos Koundouros
- My Favorite Season by André Téchiné
- Olympia by Leni Riefenstahl
- Private Lessons by Alan Myerson
- R'Xmas by Abel Ferrara
- Samurai Cop by Amir Shervan
- South of Heaven, West of Hell by Dwight Yoakam
- Spring in a Small Town by Fei Mu
- The Killer by John Woo
- The Sinister Urge by Edward D. Wood, Jr.
- The Terrorist by Santosh Sivan
- Tokyo Decadence by Ryu Murakami
- The Bridge by Gérard Depardieu and Frédéric Auburtin
- Wife to Be Sacrificed by Masaru Konuma starring Naomi Tani
- Yellow by Chris Chan Lee
