= Tim Colceri =

American actor and comedian

- Born: June 15, 1951 (age 75); Canton, Ohio, U.S.
- Education: Arizona State University
- Occupations: Film and television actor
- Years active: 1983 – present
- Military career
- Allegiance: United States of America
- Branch: United States Marine Corps
- Service years: 1969–1971
- Conflicts: Vietnam War

Tim Colceri (born June 15, 1951) is an American actor and comedian. He is most known for his role in the 1987 Stanley Kubrick film Full Metal Jacket, where he played the door gunner who uttered the much-quoted lines "Get some!" (adopted as the byline for the 2008 movie Tropic Thunder) and "Ain't war hell?" He was originally cast to play Gunnery Sergeant Hartman but was replaced by R. Lee Ermey.

== Biography ==
=== Early life and education ===
Colceri was born on June 15, 1951, in Canton, Ohio. When he was two years old, his parents moved to Phoenix, Arizona, where he grew up. At age 18, Tim enlisted in the U.S. Marine Corps and spent 13 months in Da Nang, Vietnam. He was discharged on his twentieth birthday, and immediately enrolled at Arizona State University, majoring in physical education with his goal of being a wrestling coach.

=== Career ===
Colceri became a professional golf player after graduating from college. Three years later, he cut a tendon in his little finger and was forced to find a new profession. He worked at the Victoria Station Restaurant near the Miami airport for three years, then got a job with Braniff Airlines as a flight attendant.

He got into acting through a friend who was taking an acting class and insisted he try acting.

== Filmography ==
- Inside the Love House (1983) - Joe
- Never Too Young to Die (1986) - Grady
- Full Metal Jacket (1987) - Doorgunner
- Emanon (1987) - Construction Worker
- Talent for the Game (1991) - Baseball manager (uncredited)
- Silk Stalkings (1992, TV Series) - Pike
- Who's the Boss? (1992, TV Series) - Construction Worker
- To Protect and Serve (1992) - Franklin
- Slaughter of the Innocents (1993) - Warden Bates
- CIA II: Target Alexa (1993) - CIA Guard
- The Secret World of Alex Mack (1994, TV Series) - Mr. Heller
- Potion d'amour (1994)
- Rage (1995) - Parrish
- Leprechaun 4: In Space (1996) - Metal Head
- Eraser (1996) - Lobby Guard
- Riot (1996) - Garrison
- The Underground (1997) - Palcone
- Against the Law (1997) - Officer I.Q.
- Babylon 5: In the Beginning (1998, TV Movie) - Captain Jankowski
- Charades (1998) - Rich man (uncredited)
- Fallen Arches (1998) - Officer Harding
- Ultimate Target (2000) - Bob Weinerman
- Bad Guys (2000) - Special Agent Todd
- Megiddo (2001) - Adm. Hansen
- Reflections of Evil (2002) - Vietnam War Hero
- Soap Girl (2002) - Married Man
- Hitters (2002) - Torillo
- The Gun (From 6 to 7:30 p.m.) (2003) - AJ - Strip Club Owner
- Wounded Love (2004) - Rebecca's father
- Raspberry & Lavender (2004) - Frank Whitworth
- The Last Eve (2005) - Priest
- Razortooth (2006)
- Alibi (2007) - Costello
- Evilution (2008) - Sgt. Gabriel Collins
- Space Girls in Beverly Hills (2009) - Baron Von Benson
- Kimchi Warrior 2D Feast of Fury (2011) - Evil Lord Disease
- The Devil Inside (2012) - Priest
- Garbage (2013) - Associate Producer
- Cry of the Butterfly (2014) - Police Officer
- Retreat! (2016) - Coleman
