= Samurai Cop 2: Deadly Vengeance =

2015 American action film

- Film poster
- Directed by: Gregory Hatanaka
- Written by: Rich Mallery; T. L. Young; Gregory Hatanaka
- Based on: Characters by Amir Shervan
- Produced by: Mathew Karedas; Rich Mallery; Chris Faulisi; Narumi Inatsugu; Michael P. Blevins; Gregory Hatanaka; Marc Edward Heuck
- Starring: Mathew Karedas; Mark Frazer; Bai Ling; Kayden Kross; Tommy Wiseau
- Cinematography: Chris Faulisi
- Edited by: B.N. Lindstrom
- Music by: Toshiyuki Hiraoka
- Production company: CineRidge Entertainment
- Distributed by: Cinema Epoch
- Release date: October 9, 2015 (United States)
- Running time: 94 minutes
- Country: United States
- Language: English

Samurai Cop 2: Deadly Vengeance (also titled Revenge of the Samurai Cop) is a 2015 American comedy action film co-written, co-produced, and directed by Gregory Hatanaka, a sequel to the 1991 cult film Samurai Cop. The film stars Mathew Karedas (who also produced), Mark Frazer, Melissa Moore, Cranston Komuro, Jimmy Williams, and Gerald Okamura reprising their original roles, with Tommy Wiseau (who also executively produced), Bai Ling, Laurene Landon, Mel Novak, Mindy Robinson, Lexi Belle, Joselito Rescober, and Joe Estevez appearing as new characters while Kayden Kross also appears, replacing Janis Farley (who shows up via archive footage) in her role of Jennifer.

The film was produced independently, with the budget raised by Kickstarter and Indiegogo.

== Plot ==
In 1991, after taking down the Katana crime organization, (Note: As depicted in the film Samurai Cop.) LAPD Detective Joe Marshall plans to settle down with his girlfriend Jennifer when she is suddenly murdered by a young boy at a park.

Twenty-five years later, Katana boss Fuj Fujiyama has successfully rebuilt his syndicate into a powerful multi-national organization, but is caught up in the midst of a gang war with the Shinjuku and Ginza clans. He informs his Vice President Doggé Sakamoto and subordinates that the war has awakened a long-missing Joe, and they must defeat him in order to secure the future of the clan.

Following the murder of a senator at the hands of Katana agent Hera and the Katana's massacre of the Shinjuku at a night club, Joe's old partner Detective Frank Washington is led to a secret compound 400 miles away from Los Angeles and reunited with Joe, who has lived in self-imposed exile since Jennifer's death. After dispatching a group of ninjas at the compound, Joe reluctantly agrees to again team up with Frank after being told that the case of his wife's murder will be reopened for his vengeance. After being reinstated as a detective, Joe proposes to set up a surveillance on the warring clans. At the same time, he develops a relationship with a brunette woman named Milena Roberts, who bears an uncanny resemblance to his late Jennifer.

During a surveillance mission, Joe enters a nightclub, where he is suddenly greeted by a blonde Milena before a shootout between the Katana and the Ginza forces. Soon after, Frank warns Joe that Milena is not who she says she is. The next day, Frank is suspended due to his failure to stop the war while Joe is informed that the case is now under the jurisdiction of FBI Agent Carter, who is actually the Ginza's new leader. Joe and Frank decide to work outside the law to take down all the clans at the secret hideout known as "The Complex". Joe storms through The Complex, encountering the Ginza clan before Carter is shot by Mola Ram, leader of the Yick Lung clan. Joe kills Fujiyama and his henchwomen, then defeats Doggé in a sword fight. Linton Kitano, the new leader of the Shinjuku clan, battles Joe and is swiftly taken down, but confesses to Joe that he was the one who murdered Jennifer 25 years before. Linton prepares to commit seppuku, but Milena intervenes, revealing that she is his sister and they used Joe to infiltrate the Katana and help the Shinjuku become the only clan in the country. A disillusioned Joe leaves The Complex and parts ways with Frank and Detective Higgins before Lauren Kimura, a former Katana henchwoman, proposes to join forces with him.

== Cast ==
- Mathew Karedas as Joe Marshall
- Mark Frazer as Frank Washington
- Bai Ling as Doggé Sakamoto
- Kayden Kross as Milena Roberts/Jennifer
  - Janis Farley appears as Jennifer in archival footage
- Tommy Wiseau as Linton Kitano
- Cranston Komuro as Fuj Fujiyama
- Laurene Landon as Detective Higgins
- Mel Novak as Cutter
- Gerald Okamura as Okamura
- Melissa Moore as Peggy
- Lexi Belle as Hera
- Joe Estevez as Captain Robert Harmon
- Nicole Bailey as Tessa
- Mindy Robinson as Lauren Kimura
- Thomas J. Churchill as Roger Takahara
- Jimmy Williams as Carter
- Robbie Augspurger as Mola Ram
- Lisa London as Master Kitano
- Kristine DeBell as Bobbie
- Nicole D'Angelo as Anna
- Joselito Rescober as Alfonso Rafael Federico Sebastian
- Jesse Hlubik as Lior
- Matthew Mahaney as Zemko
- Kevin Gowen as Thakar
- Yuka Sano as Yoshiwara
- Noah Inatsugu as young Linton Kitano

== Production ==
Robert Z'Dar, who played Yamashita in the first film, was planned to reprise his role in the sequel but died during production before he could shoot his scenes. The film is dedicated in memory of him and the first film's writer and director, Amir Shervan, who died in 2006.

The feature documentary Enter the Samurai, which chronicles the making of Samurai Cop 2, was released on July 22, 2016.

Following the release of the original Samurai Cop, lead actor Matthew Karedas (then called Matthew Hannon) was presumed dead by fans as there had been no communication from him. Fueling these rumors, a member of the production team of Samurai Cop also stated Hannon had died. However, Hannon was keeping an eye on the film "reading IMDB comments" and was urged by his daughter to reveal that he was not in fact dead, leading him to post a YouTube video. This posting of this video lead to Hannon regaining notoriety and the successful Kickstarter campaign which lead to Samurai Cop 2.

== Reception ==
Felix Vasquez of Cinema-Crazed.com called it a "mixed bag", describing the performances as "either way over the top or wooden" and calling the narrative stretched. He concludes that the film "isn't perfect, but it's a definite guilty pleasure with some memorable moments".
