= Kimmarie Johnson =

American model and businesswoman (1976–2026)

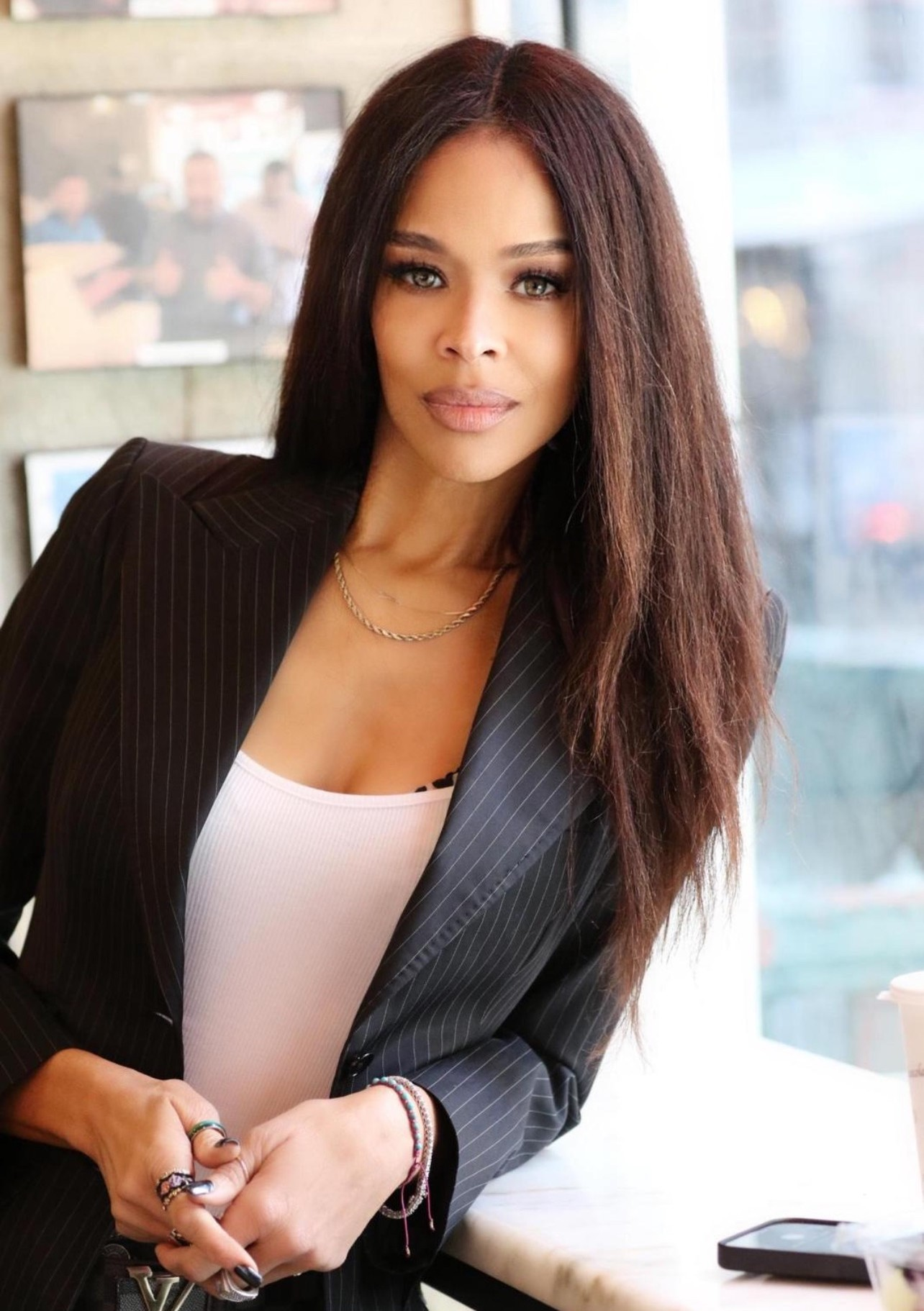
- Johnson in 2025
- Born: Kim Marie Johnson; April 8, 1976; Pittsburgh, Pennsylvania, U.S.
- Died: November 4, 2026 (aged 50); Los Angeles, California, U.S.
- Occupations: Actress; model; businesswoman
- Years active: 1993–2026
- Children: 1
- Modeling information
- Height: 5 ft 9.5 in (1.77 m)
- Hair color: Brown
- Eye color: Green

Kimmarie Johnson (born Kim Marie Johnson; April 8, 1976 – November 4, 2026) was an American actress, model, businesswoman and beauty pageant titleholder. She was the founder of SkinGlow by Kimmarie, a skin care and beauty retailing and consulting company she founded in 2011.

Earlier in her career, Johnson participated in and won the Miss Pennsylvania USA beauty pageant. She went on to represent the state of Pennsylvania in the Miss USA pageant.

== Early life and education ==
Kimmarie Johnson was born April 8, 1976, in Pittsburgh, the youngest child of Edward Frank Johnson and Caroline Ella Johnson. She was raised in Wilkinsburg, Pennsylvania, where she attended Wilkinsburg High School. In her senior year at Wilkinsburg High, she enrolled in and successfully completed the Youth Competencies Program, a program sponsored by the Allegheny County Department of Federal Programs. Johnson was named Homecoming Queen in high school and then, later, also in college.

Until age 10, Johnson lived with both of her parents; her parents separated when she was about 10 years old after which she, her two brothers, and her mother lived with her grandmother, Eleanor Elizabeth Taliaferro West, and then with various family members.

At age 16, she became a surrogate mother for her oldest brother's infant daughter, Rhonda Deneen Johnson.

Johnson went on to study elementary education and child psychology at California University of Pennsylvania after which she moved to New York City. Johnson's oldest brother died in 2003, seven days before the birth of her son, Cameron Nino. In 2004, four months after her oldest brother's death, Johnson's mother died from cancer.

== Career ==
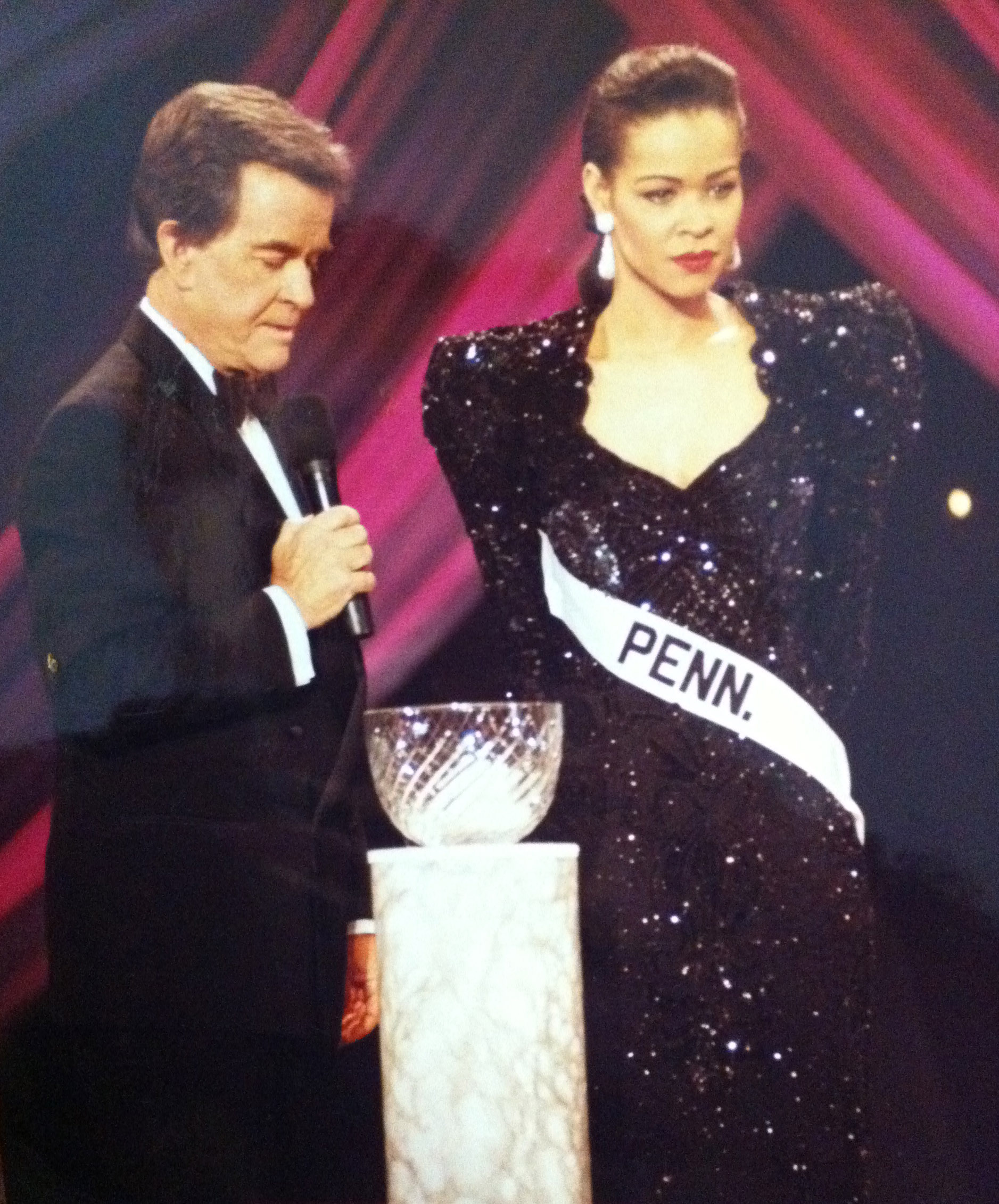
Johnson with Dick Clark, 1993

After college, Johnson worked as a flight attendant on international routes. While working with the airline, she was signed by Docherty, a Pittsburgh-based modelling agency. She was offered roles as a model for Vidal Sassoon, Oscar de la Renta, and United Colors of Benetton. In 1992, without any prior pageantry training, background, or experience, Johnson competed in and won the Miss Pennsylvania USA beauty pageant. She went on to represent the state of Pennsylvania in the 1993 Miss USA beauty pageant. She finished in the top 5 with higher scores than the 1993 winner and was the judges’ favorite to win the pageant. Johnson did not answer the question in the finals.

In 1996, Johnson moved to Los Angeles and continued modeling for the LA California Mart, and Lady Footlocker. While in Los Angeles, she began a career in acting. She booked her first acting role in the movie Dude, Where's My Car?. Johnson immediately started learning her craft as an actor, studying under Janet Alhanti in the studio of Margie Habor. She soon discovered that she also had a passion for dancing and enrolled in several dance studios to improve her skills. Johnson appeared in several episodes of the TV series Beverly Hills, 90210 and Wanda at Large. She also appeared in the film the Diary of a Tired Black Man.

After the birth of her son in 2003, Johnson took a break from her career for a few years. While on hiatus, she studied at The Groundlings. In 2006, Johnson was voted Actress of the Month by the Independent Filmmakers Alliance From 2007 to 2010, she played several lead roles at various theatres, including The Next Stage, The Dark Side of The Moon, and The Puppet Show, and appeared in an adaptation of A Christmas Carol.

=== Film production ===
Johnson was executive producer for The Last Eve directed by Korean American director Young Man Kang. This film won several awards in film festivals including Best Action Feature Film Award in the New York International Independent Film and Video Festival and Best Cinematography in the New York B Movie Film Festival.

=== Businesswoman ===
In 2011, Johnson teamed up with several skin care and beauty industry leaders and started SkinGlow by Kimmarie, a skin care and beauty line of products. In September 2012, she launched her first product, Ori Shea Butter, a 100% all natural extract from the Shea nut tree.

== Death ==
Johnson suffered a heart-related medical emergency at her home in Los Angeles, California, on October 27, 2026, and was hospitalized at Cedars-Sinai Medical Center, where she was diagnosed with a heart aneurysm condition. She died on the afternoon of November 4, at the age of 50.

== Filmography ==
=== Film ===
Year	Title	Role	Notes
1998	Let's Talk About Sex	'Lena' Girl	
2000	Dude, Where's My Car?	Jumpsuit Chick #5	
2001	Carman: The Champion	Corey	
2001	1st Testament CIA Vengeance	Liz	Video
2001	Shadow Fury	Call Girl	
2002	Spanish Fly	-	
2004	Gang Warz	Paige	
2005	Break a Leg	Sexy Woman	
2008	Angel Blade	Lovely Phadera	Video
2008	Diary of a Tired Black Man	Sexy Woman At Club	
2010	Legacy	Danica Forrest	
2011	The Summer of Massacre	Jesse's Fiance	
2014	The Next Dance	Mrs. Carrion	Video

=== Television ===
Year	Title	Role	Notes
1998	Beverly Hills 90210	Judy	Episode: "The Following Options"
2000	VIP	Rani	Episode: "Vallery's Secret"
2003	Wanda at Large	Kelly	Episode: "Death of a Councilman"
2017	Tucker's War	Rebekah Hamilton	Episode: "The Valley of Death"

=== Producer ===
- 2005, The Last Eve, executive producer
- 2010, Kimchi Warrior, executive producer

=== Acting ===
- 2004, Korean Report: Young Man Kang Goes to Hollywood (TV documentary) (playing herself)
