= Young Man Kang =

Korean film director (born 1966)

- Born: South Korea
- Occupations: Film director, producer

Korean name
- Hangul: 강영만
- RR: Gang Yeongman
- MR: Kang Yŏngman
- Website: www.youngmankang.com

Young Man Kang (born April 6, 1966, in South Chungcheong, South Korea) is a South Korean filmmaker based in Los Angeles, California, United States. Kang directed and produced The Last Eve (2005), Soap Girl (2002), Cupid's Mistake (2001) and Kimchi Warrior (2009). He is the director and founder of Seoul Webfest.

== Early life ==
Young Man Kang studied fine arts at Hong-ik University in Seoul, Korea. In 1994, Kang moved to New York City where he studied film at the New School. In 1996, Kang moved to Los Angeles and began his film career working as a director for a television commercial production company.

== Career ==
Between 2000 and 2010, Kang directed five feature films. His feature debut, Cupid's Mistake, was made with a budget of US$980 and held screenings in Los Angeles and New York City. Cupid's Mistake's low budget earned Kang a Guinness World Records award for the lowest film budget on record.

In 2013, Kang premiered the documentary Innocence Abandoned: Street Kids of Haiti at the Monaco Charity Film Festival.

Kang created the animated web drama Kimchi Warrior in 2009 to help promote kimchi and taekwondo in entertainment. The animation uses a mix of 2D animation with Flash, Photoshop, and After Effects and includes a character designed by Christopher Nadolski. Kimchi Warrior won several awards at the Los Angeles Web Series Festival including Best Animation and Best Score.

In 2019, Kang released the web series Lotte Haus with the support of the Wetzlar Lotte House in Germany and the Lotte World Tower in Seoul, South Korea. Lotte House is based on Johann Wolfgang von Goethe’s first novel, “The Sorrows of Young Werther”. Lotte Haus won the award for Best Branded Series at the British Web Awards in 2020 as well as several others at various festivals.

Kang's production company, YMK Films, is located in Los Angeles, California.

=== Seoul Webfest ===
Kang founded Seoul Webfest (formerly known as KWebFest) in July 2015. It takes place yearly in South Korea and is the first web series festival in Korea & Northeast Asia. The event was created as a result of the popularity of web series in Korea. Each year, Seoul Webfest chooses between 100 and 150 web series to screen and offers 30 to 40 awards. Additionally, the festival features panels, question and answer sessions, technology exhibitions, and tours.

The event was formally sponsored by the South Korean Ministry of Culture, Sports and Tourism.

== Filmography ==
1. Prayer Loreley - Director, Producer, Writer, Cinematographer 2026, starring international actors Iuliia Milshina and David Ogrodowski
2. Lotte Haus - Director, Producer 2019
3. Beyond the Border - Director, Producer, Writer (screenplay), Cinematographer, Editor 2009
4. Haitian Street Kids Revisited - Director, Producer 2009
5. Kimchi Warrior - Director, Producer, Writer, 2009
6. Mad Cowgirl - Dirty Ho (as actor) 2006
7. Koreatown - Producer 2006
8. The Last Eve - Director, Producer, Writer, Cinematographer 2005
9. Until the Night - Reporter 2004
10. Death Valley Diary - Director, Producer, Writer, 2003
11. Soap Girl - Director, Editor 2002
12. Secret of the Five Fingers (video) - Cinematographer 2002
13. Cupid's Mistake - Director, Producer, Writer, Young 2001
14. 1st Testament CIA Vengeance - Director, Producer, Korean Peace Preservation Agent, Editor 2001
15. America So Beautiful - Storyboard Artist 2001
16. Haitian Slave Children (documentary short) - Director, Cinematographer, Editor 2001
17. Images of Korea (short) - Director, Writer 2000
18. Desire L.A. (short) - Director, Producer 2000
19. Rocket's Red Glare - Storyboard Artist 2000
20. Toilet Lesson (short) - Director, Producer, Writer 2000
21. The Mao Game - Storyboard Artist 1999
22. Death of Sunflower - Director, Writer 1999

=== As Himself ===
- KBS Korean Report; Young Man Kang Goes to Hollywood (documentary, 2004)

== Awards and honors ==
Won

- New York International Independent Film and Video Festival:
  1. Best Action Feature Film Award (The Last Eve)
- New York B Movie Film Festival:
  1. Best Cinematography (The Last Eve)
- Big Bear Lake International Film Festival:
  1. Audience Award (Soap Girl)
- WorldFest Houston:
  1. Silver Award (Haitian Slave Children)
- Jamerican International Film Festival:
  1. Best Effort (Haitian Slave Children)
- New York B Movie Film Festival:
  1. Killer B Award (1st Testament CIA Vengeance)
  2. Special Achievement (1st Testament CIA Vengeance)

== See also ==
- List of Korean film directors
- Cinema of Korea
