= Tomiko Lee =

South Korean actress and producer

Tomiko Okhee Lee
- Occupations: Television actress and film producer

Korean name
- Hangul: 이옥희
- RR: I Okhui
- MR: I Okhŭi

Tomiko Okhee Lee (Korean: 이옥희) is a South Korean actress and producer. She has starred in several television shows and movies, such as The Byrds of Paradise (1993–94), Soap Girl (2002), The Last Eve (2005) and two episodes of Lost (2004–2010). She was also an executive producer on both Soap Girl and The Last Eve.
