= Hope in Heaven =

Film by Meredith Ralston

Hope in Heaven is a documentary that examines the Philippines sex trade and the young women and children it trafficks. It was part of a five-year development project funded by the Canadian International Development Agency (CIDA) in cooperation with Mount Saint Vincent University (MSVU) and Saint Mary's University, of Halifax, Nova Scotia, Canada.

== Plot ==
Hope in Heaven, by filmmaker Meredith Ralston, examines the Philippines brutal sex trade and the young women and children it enslaves. Seen through the eyes of two idealistic female students and a male university professor, the film captures two years of Mila's life and the people who befriend her, the poverty and squalor she lives of Angeles City she lives in. The documentary depicts the social hygiene clinic in Angeles where hundreds of young women and children line up daily for health checks in primitive conditions. Interviews with prostitutes, mama-sans, community workers, academics and clients expose the complexity of prostitution in two very different cultures. The documentary also shows live footage of seventeen children (some as young as ten years old) are rescued from a local brothel in Angeles and caught disturbingly on film.

== Funding ==
Hope in Heaven was part of a five-year development project funded by the Canadian International Development Agency (CIDA) in cooperation with Mount Saint Vincent University (MSVU) and Saint Mary's University, of Halifax, Nova Scotia, Canada.

== Profits ==
All profits from the documentary were donated to the Women Helping Women Center in Angeles City, and to Mila, who suffers from tuberculosis.

== Produced in association with ==
- The Canadian International Development Agency
- CIDA-AUCC TIER 2 UPCD Programme
- Mount Saint Vincent University
- MSVU Technology Learning and Research Centre
- Saint Mary's University
- SMU International Activities Office

== Meredith Ralston ==
The documentary was written, directed and produced by Meredith Ralston. Ralston is a professor in the women's studies and political studies Departments at Mount Saint Vincent University and president of Ralston Productions Ltd. in Halifax where she lives. She is a graduate of the UCLA School of Theater, Film and Television. Ralston is a Fredericton High School graduate who studied political science at the University of New Brunswick before earning her degree at the University of Toronto.

== The book ==
Ralston published her book dealing with this as Reluctant Bedfellows in 2008.

== Narration ==
Narrated by Kiefer Sutherland.

== Awards ==
Hope In Heaven (Selling Sex in Heaven) won Best Documentary at the Big Bear Lake International Film Festival in California. It was also featured at the Atlantic Film Festival in September 2005.
