= Soap Girl =

- Soap Girl Poster
- Directed by: Young Man Kang
- Starring: Luciano Saber; Kerry Liu; Gina Hiraizumi
- Cinematography: Henryk Cymerman
- Distributed by: Vanguard Cinema
- Release date: December 6, 2002
- Running time: 90 minutes
- Country: United States
- Language: English

Soap Girl is a 2002 drama film directed by Young Man Kang, a Korean-born filmmaker who made his U.S. directing debut with Cupid's Mistake.

== Plot ==
A seemingly innocent woman becomes involved in the netherworld of massage parlors in this drama. Maya (Kerry Liu) is a young East Asian woman who arrives one day at a seedy massage parlor in a run-down neighborhood in Los Angeles. Dressed in shabby clothes and speaking in broken English, she asks Mamasan (Tomiko Lee), who runs the parlor, for a job, and Mamasan immediately puts the attractive Maya on staff. While obviously new to the world of "shower and massage" - which is about sex rather than physical therapy - Maya soon becomes one of the most popular women working the parlor, and she soon bonds with her co-workers, including the thick-skinned Asia (Gina Hiraizumi), vulnerable Yuko (Mari Tanaka), practical Jenna (Hiromi Nishiyama), and self-centered Sammy (Kate Holliday). Maya also gets to know Harry (Luciano Saber), a freelance writer and would-be poet who at the age of thirty has yet to lose his virginity. As he stops in for the occasional "massage," Maya and the painfully shy Harry find themselves developing a very non-businesslike infatuation for one another, and as she confronts her growing love for Harry, Maya must come to terms with the secret that brought her to the parlor in the first place.

== Production and release ==
The story was pitched to Director Kang, [which was] basically an intense, disturbing dark comedy about hijinks at a massage parlor involving geeky male virgins, gangsters and immigrants. "So the story evolved away from the "Pretty Woman/Cinderella" story and into one that plays on the audience's expectations of Asian stereotypes. Maya turns out not to be an immigrant, though everyone in the beginning believes that she is. None of the massage girls are naive, innocent lambs with hearts of gold; [they] are simply trying to survive."
This film received the Audience Award at the 2002 Big Bear Lake International Film Festival. Soap Girl had its theatrical release on December 6, 2002 in Los Angeles, and critical reaction was mixed and controversial. "Soap Girl" has engendered the most vociferous pro-and-con arguments I've ever seen on the AsianAmericanFilm.com message boards. This film was a big success in the box office at the Wallace Theater in Honolulu, Hawaii February 14, 2003. Soap Girl DVD released on January 24, 2006.

== Awards and honors ==
Won

- Big Bear Lake International Film Festival:
  1. Audience Award (Young Man Kang)
