= Blue Dream =

- Directed by: Gregory Hatanaka
- Written by: Gregory Hatanaka; T.L. Young
- Produced by: Gregory Hatanaka; Clinton H. Wallace; Tomi Ilic; Chris Faulisi; Barry O'Rourke
- Starring: James Duval; Dominique Swain; Pollyanna McIntosh; Kayden Kross; Noah Hathaway; Walter Koenig
- Cinematography: Chris Faulisi
- Edited by: B.N. Lindstrom
- Music by: Toshiyuki Hiraoka
- Distributed by: Cinema Epoch
- Release dates: February 16, 2013 (San Francisco Independent Film Festival); September 10, 2013
- Running time: 89 minutes
- Language: English

Blue Dream is a 2013 drama film directed by Gregory Hatanaka. It stars James Duval, Dominique Swain, Pollyanna McIntosh, Kayden Kross, Noah Hathaway, and Walter Koenig and Sal Landi. It premiered at the SF Indiefest and Gold Coast Film Festival in Australia.

== Premise ==
Robert Harmon is a newspaper journalist in the late 1990s. As the Internet begins to take over and print circulation declines, he is forced to make a series of unethical and immoral decisions leading to his downfall.

== Cast ==
- James Duval — Robert Harmon
- Dominique Swain — Gena Townsend
- Pollyanna McIntosh — Amanda
- Kayden Kross — Tara
- Noah Hathaway — Roper Karlsson
- Sal Landi — George Weber
- Walter Koenig - Lasse Karlsson
- Richard Riehle - Ted Sellers
- Olivia Barash - Rachel Purviance
- Nicole D'Angelo - Heather/Tatyana
- Stanley B. Herman - Detective Addy
- Elana Krausz - Jo Tynan
- Brian McGuire - Kojira Karlsson
- Barry O'Rourke - Charles
- Paula LaBaredas - Nathalie
- Naoyuki Ikeda - Takahashi
- Bogdan Szumilas - Feng Kwai-Sher
