= The Real Wedding Crashers =

- Genre: Comedy, Reality
- Country of origin: United States
- Original language: English
- No. of seasons: 1
- No. of episodes: 6

Production
- Running time: 60 minutes
- Production companies: Katalyst Films; New Line Television

Original release
- Network: NBC
- Release: April 23 – May 28, 2007

The Real Wedding Crashers is an American prank/hidden camera series on NBC, inspired by the 2005 comedy film Wedding Crashers, that premiered on April 23, 2007. Ashton Kutcher, who helped create the concept, had explored a similar idea in Punk'd.

The series was produced by the aforementioned Ashton Kutcher, Karey Burke, Rich Meehan, Jon Kroll, Jim Rosenthal, and Jason Goldberg with RDF USA, the production company of shows such as Wife Swap, in association with New Line Television, part of the studio that produced the film. No one among the show's main cast and crew were involved in the original film, nor were the cast and crew of the film involved with the series.

It was announced on May 7, 2007, that the series would be pulled after the final four episodes. NBC subsequently announced the show was defunct on May 28, 2007. NBC announced on July 20, 2007 that the show was not renewed. The last two episodes both aired on NBC and on the Style Network.

== Episodes ==
Episode number	Date	Couple	Viewers millions	Note
1	Apr 23, 2007	Jonnie and Derek	6.7	
2	Apr 30, 2007	Jennifer and Jay	5.6	
3	May 7, 2007	Melissa and Eric	14.8	
4	May 14, 2007	Jina and Christian	18.9	Rescheduled twice from June 25 and July 2, 2007
5	May 21, 2007	Erica and Manoli	15.5	Rescheduled from July 9, 2007
6	May 28, 2007	Denise and Steve	3.9	Rescheduled from July 16, 2007

== Series cast ==
- Ben Gleib
- Steve Byrne
- Catherine Reitman
- Gareth Reynolds
- Desi Lydic

=== Notable guest star ===
- Robin Bain
