= The Dead Inside (2011 film) =

- Directed by: Travis Betz
- Written by: Travis Betz
- Starring: Sarah Lassez, Dustin Fasching
- Cinematography: Shannon Hourigan
- Edited by: Travis Betz
- Music by: Michael Brake, Joel Van Vliet
- Production companies: Drexel Box Productions, Hundy Gilbert Media, Robot vs Dinosaur
- Release date: December 20, 2011 (Blue Whiskey Independent Film Festival)
- Running time: 98 minutes
- Country: United States
- Language: English

The Dead Inside is a 2011 musical horror film that was directed by Travis Betz. The film had its world premiere on December 20, 2011 at the Blue Whiskey Independent Film Festival and was released to DVD on November 20, 2012. It stars Sarah Lassez and Dustin Fasching as a young couple that must deal with supernatural along with their own personal demons.

Betz was inspired to make the film after he and his girlfriend had both been "creatively dead for quite some time" and he'd woken one night to hear her making strange noises while she slept. This prompted him to come up with the idea for The Dead Inside and he chose to make it a musical after watching Sarah Lassez perform at a karaoke bar.

== Synopsis ==
Fi (Sarah Lassez) and Wes (Dustin Fasching) are deeply in love, but they find themselves forced to take unfulfilling jobs in order to make ends meet. Wes would rather take pictures of things that interest him, but has to work as a wedding photographer. Fi has been suffering from writer's block and her steady job as the author of The Dead Survive, a series of zombie-themed books, isn't helping her creative juices flow. Their tenuous existence is further threatened when Fi begins to develop signs of schizophrenia that are revealed to be possibly demonic in nature.

== Cast ==
- Sarah Lassez as Fi
- Dustin Fasching as Wes

== Reception ==
Fangoria gave the film three out of four skulls and stated that the movie was "a gratifying, rarely predictable experience that works as a musical, relationship drama and horror film simultaneously." Ain't It Cool News praised the film's acting and music, but stated that the movie had "a few pacing issues towards the end as it feels the angsty lyrical hysterics seem to overstay their welcome".

=== Awards ===
- Best Score Award at the Los Angeles United Film Festival (2011, won)
- Shriekfest Award for Best Supernatural Feature Film at Shriekfest (2011, won)
- Dan Harkins Breakthrough Filmmaker Award at the Phoenix Film Festival (2011, won)
