= Lo (film) =

2009 American film

- Theatrical release poster
- Directed by: Travis Betz
- Written by: Travis Betz
- Produced by: Vicky Jenson; Tom Devlin; Aaron Gaffey; Jessica Petelle; Lola Wallace
- Starring: Sarah Lassez; Jeremiah Birkett
- Cinematography: Joshua Reis
- Edited by: Travis Betz
- Music by: Scott Glasgow
- Production company: Synkronized Films
- Distributed by: Entertainment One (DVD)
- Release date: October 24, 2009 (Austin Film Festival)
- Country: United States
- Language: English

Lo is a 2009 American romantic comedy horror film written and directed by Travis Betz. The film premiered at the Austin Film Festival October 2009 and was released on DVD in February 2010.

== Plot ==
Justin (Ward Roberts) sits inside a pentagram. He has obvious claw marks on his chest. He cuts his hand and uses a spell from a book to summon the crippled demon Lo (Jeremiah Birkett). Justin orders Lo to search Hell for his girlfriend April (Sarah Lassez), who was abducted by a demon. Lo argues that the task will be impossible, but eventually concedes and asks for information about April. Justin describes his first meeting with the endearing, quirky April; the memory is depicted as a vaudeville production.

The demon Jeez, who abducted April, arrives. It tells Justin that April is actually a murderous demon who abandoned Hell in order to experience human love. Justin denies this despite Lo admitting that it knew April as a demon. Justin insults Lo and both demons leave. The cut on Justin's hand begins to speak and argues with him about April.

Lo returns and tells Justin that April is imprisoned and cannot be retrieved. Instead, it presents two damned souls who describe being tortured after April tricked them into selling their souls. Lo reveals that its legs were crushed when April returned to Hell. Justin concludes that Lo helped her escape and was punished. Lo tells him to think about her if he wants to see her again, prompting a flashback of their first Christmas together.

Justin gives April a rare edition of Faust. She seems confused by the concept of gift-giving but becomes excited about reading for amusement, which appears to be a novelty to her. April becomes confused when she realizes Justin expected a gift in return. She gives him the only thing she has: a book on demon summoning. She orders him not to open it, and to burn it if she ever leaves.

Lo says it was obvious April was a demon. Justin's hand suggests that April was manipulating Justin. Lo tells Justin that his condition will worsen the longer he stays in the circle, and he should undo the spell and leave. A waiter appears and offers Justin a drink. Lo tells Justin that the drink will allow him to travel through Hell to April, asking if Justin thinks she is worth it. Justin downs the drink, and Lo smugly tells him it was poison.

Lo leaves and Jeez returns. Jeez says the poison is slow-acting, and if he stops the spell and seeks medical treatment he will survive. Justin refuses to leave without April. Jeez asks what love is. Unable to define it, Justin merely smiles, causing Jeez to leave in irritation.

The hand and Justin argue over whether it would be better to live alone or die for April. Justin becomes distressed and decides to cut the hand off, but Lo interrupts him. Lo and Justin argue about April's true nature and whether she is worth the effort Justin is going to. Justin forces a third flashback.

Justin comforts April after she wakes up from a nightmare. Jeez appears and attacks April, fatally slashing Justin's chest in the process. April agrees to return to Hell with Jeez if she can save Justin. She leaves Justin the demon summoning book and takes the Faust book with her.

Lo admonishes Justin for not burning the book. Justin becomes philosophical about the differences between humans and demons. Lo laughs at this, infuriating Justin. Justin reasserts his control over Lo and orders it to find April. Lo leaves, and Justin begins to cry while looking at a picture of April.

April appears in front of Justin and forgives him for not burning the book. Justin affirms his love for her and his determination to bring her back. She kisses him, extracting the poison from his body. She tells Justin that she cannot come with him, because demons would pursue her and put Justin in danger. Justin offers to stay in Hell with her but April refuses. She begins to leave. As she looks back, she becomes Lo, revealing that they were the same person all along. The next day, Justin burns the book.

== Cast ==
- Ward Roberts as Justin
- Sarah Lassez as April
- Jeremiah Birkett as Lo
- Devin Barry as Jeez
- Aaron Gaffey as Waiter
- Sarah Larissa Deckert as The Demon Rat
- John Karyus as Demon Lord
- Liz Loza as June

== Production ==
Writer/director Travis Betz created the film's experimental concept after watching Jan Švankmajer's Faust and determining that restraining a lone character into one place and having demons interact with him "was a very tempting challenge". Shot in 3 days, the film has a unique visual element in that there is no scenery and that characters are revealed through lighting as the rest of the set remains in darkness. The film plays out like a real stage play. There are few characters and the storyline revolves around dialogue between the various demons and Justin.

== Release ==
=== Home media ===
Lo was released on DVD by Synkronized USA on February 9, 2010.

== Reception ==
Independent Critic gave the film a B (3.0 stars), calling it "a love story of the lowest common denominator", and noted that while the film did not reach the level of Betz's 2008 film Sunday, it was a "more ambitious film" in which Betz stretched the limits of what could be done technically on a modest budget, making it "a stellar example of how to assemble a quality, technically proficient film with largely convincing special effects on a limited budget." They also praised that despite the viewer's being aware that the entire film takes place within one restricted area, the special effects makeup, the "larger-than-life" sound design, and "deceptively simple" production design, the film maintains a simplicity that "remains completely captivating." They also noted that the film worked as well as it did because of the director's having assembled a fine cast, with special note that the film's lead Ward Roberts was able to convincingly play both ends of the emotional spectrum and take what could have been a one-dimensional character and bring "him vividly to life." They concluded that the film was "Warped, original, imaginative and quite funny."

Blog Critics relates how the film centers around the main character of Justin sitting in the center of an elaborate pentagram drawn on the floor in his darkened apartment. In describing the characterization of the summoned demons, they write that Lo "comes off like a stand-up comic putting down a heckler" and that Jeez "is at his horrifying best as the lead singer in a lounge act". They note that the film's use of flashbacks seems to "emphasize artifice as opposed to realism," and that the film has "cult potential".

JoBlo noted from viewing a trailer in 2008, that restraining a lone character into one place and having the demons interact with him "seems twisted enough to possibly be an interesting idea," but of the DVD release of the completed film, they wrote that while the concept had originality, "it sometimes feels a tad pretentious", and that due to the minimalist staging and heavy dialog, the project might have been better if explored on a theatrical stage. They also noted that while the scenes were somewhat predictable, it was "sometimes fun to watch the verbal tennis match between the characters," as the leads of Ward Roberts as Justin and Jeremiah Birkett as Lo "are good as they try to battle with words about what each player wants." But they also felt the dialog tended to drag and lose momentum. They reviewer was intrigued by the plot's "bizarre events", and granted that although it "sometimes felt as if it was trying too hard," the film for the most part held his attention through clever writing and capable actors. He also spoke well of the character make-up, writing "I was impressed with most of the make up effects here. I did find that each of the demon characters looked like something from the past, I still give credit for making it look much better than it could have."

Quiet Earth called the 2008 trailer "deliciously, and sickly, whimsical", but their opinion was modified after viewing the complete film at its debut at the Austin Film Festival. They wrote the film "is a modern variation on the "Faust" story and has its clever moments, but ultimately its reach way exceeds its grasp." They praised the make-up designs of the title demon of 'Lo' and his associate 'Jeez', writing that they were "top-notch and highly effective". They also praised the acting of Ward Roberts as Justin and Jeremiah Birkett as Lo, writing they did "fine work, good enough to distract us from the fact that both of them spend most of the running time sitting or lying in the same spot," but did not think as highly of the rest of the cast, offering that Sarah Lassez as April failed in making her character "both weird and lovable" and that Devin Barry as a "nasally fey" Jeez became "seriously annoying within seconds." They wrote that the biggest disappointment with the film was "it is simply too obviously padded," and every scene suffered from the director's "need to make the runtime acceptably feature length." They granted that the film was ambitious and it stood apart from most micro-budget films of its kind "by shooting for much artier heights", but as technically adept as the project was, it would have been far better had it been released in a shorter version.
