= Until the Night (film) =

- Directed by: Gregory Hatanaka
- Written by: Gregory Hatanaka
- Story by: Margaret Diehl
- Produced by: Taka Arai
- Starring: Norman Reedus
- Cinematography: Yasu Tanida
- Music by: Colin Chin
- Release date: 2004
- Country: United States
- Language: English

Until the Night is a 2004 American drama film written and directed by Gregory Hatanaka, and starring Norman Reedus, Kathleen Robertson, Missy Crider and Sean Young.

== Premise ==
Robert (Norman Reedus) is a writer who hasn't done much writing lately; instead, he's busy pushing the envelope with his toxic mix of boredom, drugs and a dalliance with a married woman, Elizabeth (Kathleen Robertson). In spite of Elizabeth's marital status, Robert falls for her completely—a commitment that just may blow up in his face, along with the rest of his life.

== Cast ==
- Norman Reedus as Robert
- Kathleen Robertson as Elizabeth
- Missy Crider as Mina
- Sean Young as Cosma
- Sarah Lassez as Karina
- Michael T. Weiss as Daniel
- Matthew Settle as Michael
- Aimee Graham as Cynthia
- Boyd Kestner as David
- Kaila Yu as Ali
- Stanley B. Herman as Dr. Meyers
- Danielle James as Molly
- Matthew Mahaney as Derek
- Doralina Silander as Vanessa
- Paula Labaredas as Melanie
- Ella Valentino as Action Girl
- Danielle Petty as Kelly
- Rachel Belofsky as Sarah
- Jana Thompson as Shauna
- Crash as The Bartender
- Michael Raye as Reporter #1
- Harry H. Novak as Reporter
- Tom Porterhouse as Reporter #3
- Annabel Blanchard as Reporter #4
- April Wilson as Reporter #5
- Jasmine Jong Ok Kang as Reporter #6
- Steve Lustgarten as Reporter
- Young Man Kang as Reporter
- Anthony McBride as Reporter
- Valerie Swift as Reporter
- Carisa Engle as Reporter
- Craig Sheftall as Barfly
- Jeff Milne as Guitarist / Vocalist
