= The Last Eve =

- The Last Eve
- Directed by: Young Man Kang
- Written by: Young Man Kang
- Produced by: Young Man Kang
- Starring: Bruce Khan; Reuben Langdon; Tim Colceri; Kelly Hamilton; Jourdan Lee Koo
- Edited by: Mark Crutch
- Distributed by: Vanguard Cinema
- Release date: September 29, 2005
- Running time: 88 minutes
- Country: United States
- Languages: English, Korean

The Last Eve is a 2005 action film directed by Young Man Kang, a Korean-born filmmaker who made his U.S. directorial debut with Cupid's Mistake (2001).

== Plot ==
The film consists of three tales that combine martial arts action with biblical characters: Eve's Secret, Cain and Abel, and the Snake's Temptation.

== Production and release ==
The Last Eve was shot in Death Valley, Koreatown in Los Angeles, and South Korea. The Los Angeles filming was executive produced by Kimmarie Johnson. It took 2 years to complete the film.

The film won the Best Action Feature film Award at the 2005 New York International Independent Film and Video Festival.

== Reviews ==
The Last Eve was included in Film Threat's Ten Best Unseen Films of 2005.

In his review for Film Threat, Phil Hall described the film as "the world’s first avant-garde theological martial arts love story. Taking the story of Western civilization’s first eviction recipients and spinning it across a bizarre variety of unlikely landscapes, the immensely gifted filmmaker Young Man Kang has brought forth a production which is so astonishing and original than it is impossible to compare it to anything that has ever been made."

This film was released on DVD on August 26, 2008 by Vanguard Cinema.

== Awards ==
Won
New York International Independent Film and Video Festival:

Best Action Feature Film Award (Young Man Kang)

New York B Movie Film Festival:

Best Cinematography (Young Man Kang)
