= Ryan Bittle =

American actor (born 1976)

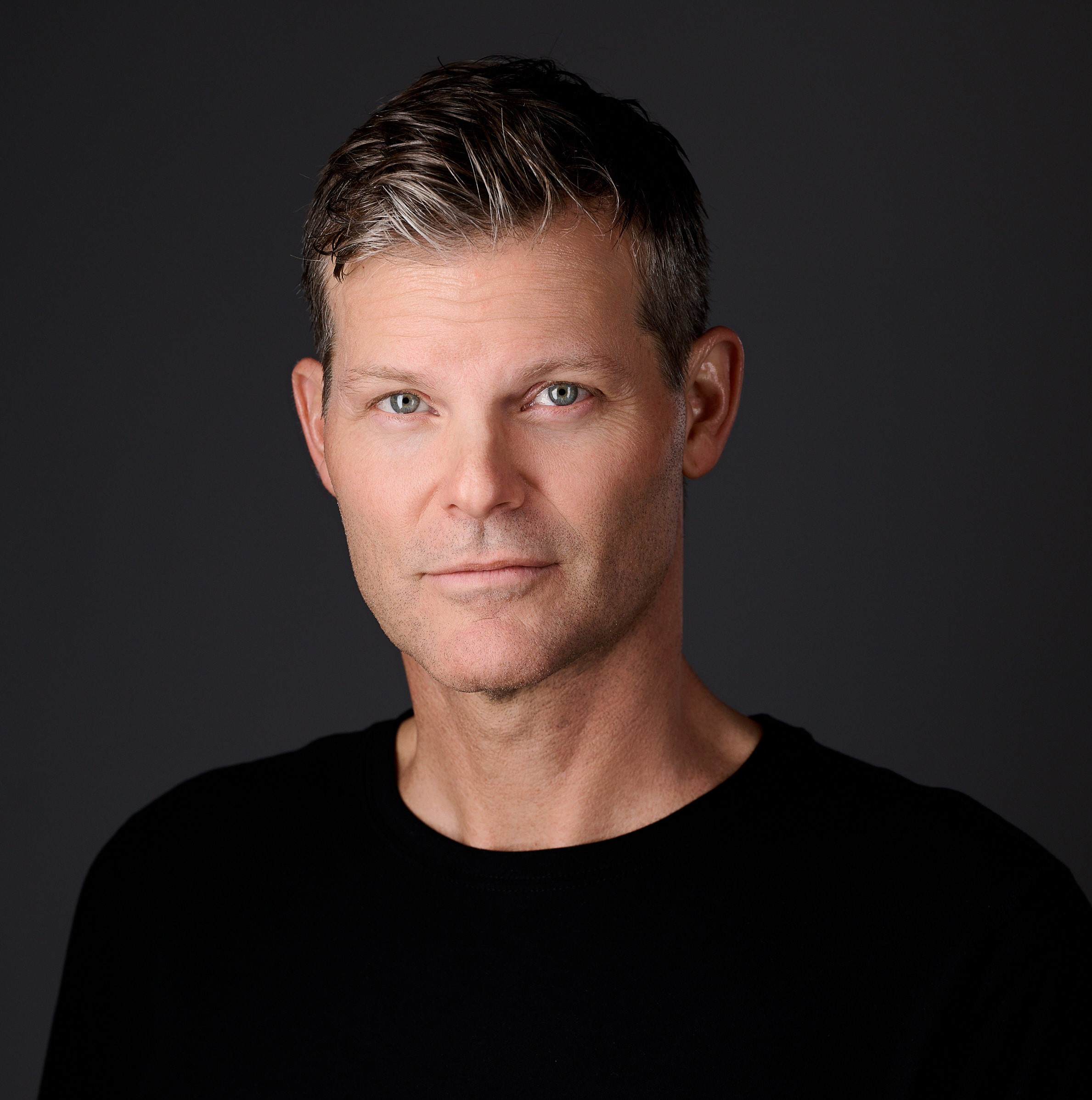
- Bittle in 2025
- Born: Ryan James Bittle; March 21, 1976 (age 50); La Crescenta, California, U.S.
- Education: Juilliard School (BFA)
- Occupation: Actor
- Years active: 1994–present
- Spouses: Jennifer Davis (m. 2003; div. 2006) Elizabeth Chang (m. 2022)

Ryan James Bittle (born March 21, 1976) is an American actor. He began appearing on television in 1994.

== Early life ==
Bittle was born in La Crescenta, California, the son of Kathy Homewood, a nurse and ICU director, and Jim Bittle, a Glendale fire captain. He has a younger brother, Ron, and an older brother, Jeff.

While attending Crescenta Valley High School, Bittle was a successful water polo athlete for the Crescenta Falcons. He later attended Pasadena City College, The London Academy of Music and Dramatic Art and The Juilliard School, Drama division (group 31), in New York City, graduating in 2002.

== Career ==
As a teenager, Bittle modelled for magazines and catalogues, including Vogue. He had planned to study environmental law at the University of California, Santa Barbara when he landed the role of Todd Wilkins in Sweet Valley High in 1994, causing him to delay attending university. He played the role of Todd for the first two seasons, before handing it over to Jeremy Garrett in 1996.

While studying at Pasadena City College, Bittle continued to work as an actor with guest starring roles in 1996 on the television series Buffy the Vampire Slayer, Boy Meets World and The Parent 'Hood. He also had a recurring role on 7th Heaven as Jessica Biel's early love interest and supporting roles in the films Devil in the Flesh and The Clown at Midnight.

While working on the latter with Christopher Plummer in 1998, Bittle decided he wanted to leave Hollywood for New York to spend some more time studying at the Juilliard School. Back in Los Angeles, Bittle continued with a recurring role on the successful WB drama Dawson's Creek and the PBS drama American Family. He had varying guest star roles on shows such as the CBS dramas CSI: Miami, CSI: NY, Numb3rs and NCIS.

He played an actor for the second time in his career on Courteney Cox's TV show Dirt. In 2003, Bittle starred as Christian opposite Mark Harelik and Gregory Itzin in Cyrano de Bergerac at South Coast Repertory.

Bittle was in three films released in 2010–11: Take Me Home Tonight, a 1980s set comedy starring with Topher Grace and Anna Faris; Backyard Wedding, starring with Alicia Witt and Frances Fisher, and the horror/thriller A Lure: Teen Fight Club.

In 2012, Bittle starred in Annie Claus Is Coming to Town, opposite Maria Thayer and Sam Page, as well as the made-for-TV movie Operation Cupcake, opposite Dean Cain and Kristy Swanson. He guest starred on The Closer and the NBC comedy The New Normal. In 2013, he guest starred on the Showtime series Shameless as well as reviving the role of JR Chandler on the revived Prospect Park's All My Children. In 2014, he starred in two films, Love by the Book, starring opposite Leah Renee, and A Christmas Mystery opposite Esmé Bianco.

== Personal life ==
In 2003, Bittle married Jennifer Davis; they divorced in 2006. In 2022, Bittle married Elizabeth Chang.

== Filmography ==
=== Film ===
Year	Title	Role	Notes
1997	Tear It Down	John Scott	
1998	Devil in the Flesh	Greg Straffer	Video
1999	The Clown at Midnight	Taylor Marshall	
2004	Who's Your Daddy?	Hudson Reed	Video
2009	A Good Funeral	Bill	
2010	Lure	Mr. Reed	Video
2011	Ricky and Ravi (Are Between Jobs)	Steve	Video short
2011	Take Me Home Tonight	Rick Herrington	
2016	Marriage of Lies	Dylan	

=== Television ===
Year	Title	Role	Notes
1994–96	Sweet Valley High	Todd Wilkins	Main role
1996	The Parent 'Hood	Bradley Lewis	"An American Class President"
1996	7th Heaven	Jeff	Recurring role
1997	Boy Meets World	Gary	"Chick Like Me"
1997	Buffy the Vampire Slayer	Mitch	"Out of Mind, Out of Sight"
2001	Walker, Texas Ranger	Harley	"Reel Rangers"
2001	The Big House	Jon Jackson	TV film
2001–02	Dawson's Creek	Eric	Recurring role
2002	American Family	Sgt. Williams	"The Forgotten War"
2003	CSI: Miami	David Kendall	"Death Grip"
2007	CSI: NY	Jackson Rudnick	"The Lying Game"
2008	Dirt	Paul Trisko	"Ties That (Don't) Bind"
2008	Numbers	Pat Drummond	"Charlie Don't Surf"
2008	NCIS	Metro Det. Justin Kemp	"Silent Night"
2010	Backyard Wedding	Jeffrey Blake	TV film
2010	Life Unexpected	Steve	"Honeymoon Interrupted"
2010	All My Children	Logan	2 episodes
2011	Femme Fatales	Archie Beecham	"Speed Date"
2011	Bones	Brock Vorback	"The Prince in the Plastic"
2011	Annie Claus Is Coming to Town	Dean	TV film
2012	Operation Cupcake	Thad Christopher	TV film
2012	The Closer	Charlie	"Hostile Witness"
2012	The New Normal	Mitch Madison	"Unplugged"
2013	Shameless	Steven Redel	"A Long Way from Home"
2013	All My Children	JR Chandler	Recurring role
2014	A Christmas Mystery	Andrew Steele	TV film
2014	Love by the Book	Landon Crest	TV film
2017	Lucifer	Mr. Taylor	"Deceptive Little Parasite"
2018–2019	Hawaii Five-0	John McGarrett	Guest role; two episodes
