= Silvia Šuvadová =

Slovak actress

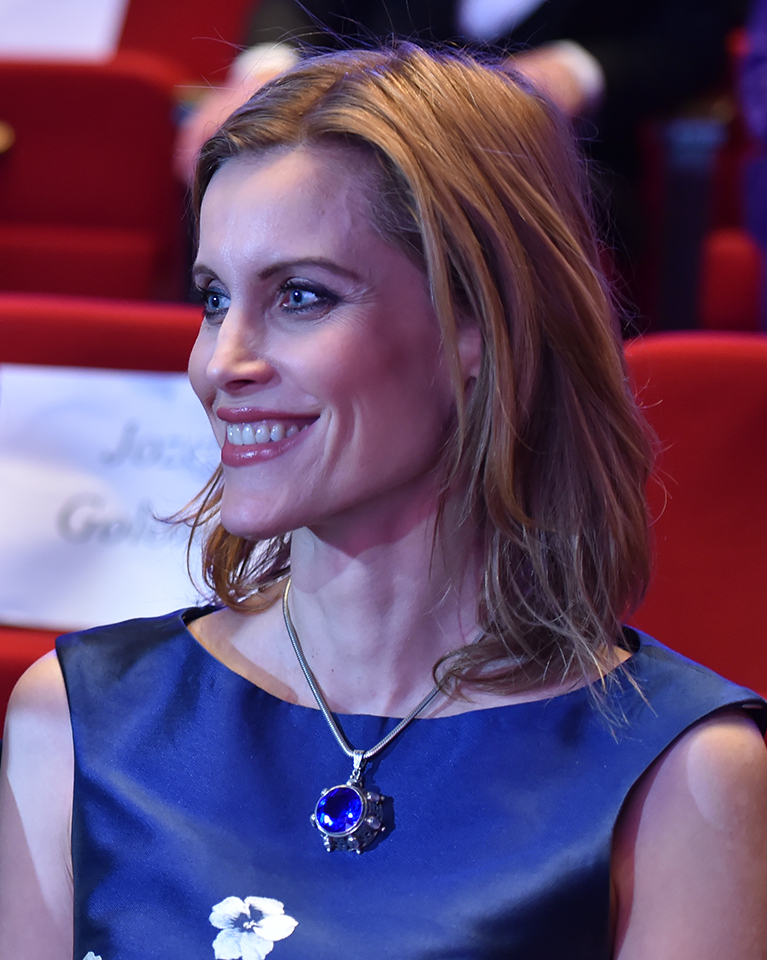
- Šuvadová in 2017
- Born: 4 April 1973 (age 51); Ružomberok, Czechoslovakia
- Occupation: Actress
- Years active: 1993–

Silvia Šuvadová (born 4 April 1973) is a Slovak actress. She is one of a small number of Slovaks to have played a part in a Hollywood movie, having appeared in the 2006 film The Fast and the Furious: Tokyo Drift. As well as appearing in the Oscar-winning 1996 film Kolya, she has also taken part in a number of reality television shows.

== Acting career ==
After completing her studies at the Academy of Performing Arts in Bratislava, Šuvadová performed on stage at theatres including the Astorka Korzo '90 Theatre in Bratislava and the Andrej Bagar Theatre in Nitra, plus the Slovak National Theatre. She made her film debut as cellist Blanka in the Oscar-winning 1996 Czech film Kolya, as she combined acting roles in theatre, cinema, and commercials in the 1990s.

Šuvadová moved to Hollywood in 2002 to pursue a film career. For her first major film role, Šuvadová played an American policewoman in the 2004 film Puppet Master vs Demonic Toys, directed by Ted Nicolaou. In 2006 she had a minor role in the film The Fast and the Furious: Tokyo Drift. In 2008 Šuvadová was in the Czech Republic, filming a three-part serialisation of Ďáblova lest for Czech Television at Loucký klášter. In 2011, the feature film Violent Blue starring Šuvadová in the lead role was released to a poor reception.

== Outside of acting ==
In October 2006 Šuvadová left the United States for six months, during which time she took part in TV JOJ's Celebrity Camp, filmed on location in the Philippines. In 2017 Šuvadová launched a new business focused on the sale of cosmetics. In 2018 she took part in the tenth season of Slovak reality television series Farma.
