= The Clown at Midnight =

- Directed by: Jean Pellerin
- Written by: Kenneth J. Hall
- Produced by: Gary Howsam; Gilles Paquin
- Starring: Sarah Lassez; James Duval; Tatyana Ali; Margot Kidder; Christopher Plummer
- Narrated by: David Kirschner; Corey Sienega
- Cinematography: Barry Gravelle
- Edited by: Robert Lower
- Music by: Glenn Buhr
- Production companies: Fries Film Group; Hallmark Entertainment
- Distributed by: GFT Paquin Entertainment
- Release date: February 9, 1999
- Running time: 91 minutes
- Language: English
- Budget: $12,000,000

The Clown at Midnight is a 1999 Canadian slasher film directed by Jean Pellerin and starring Sarah Lassez, James Duval, Tatyana Ali, Christopher Plummer and Margot Kidder.

== Plot ==
Years ago, opera singer Lorraine Sedgewick was killed in her dressing room at an opera house, supposedly by Lorenzo Orsini, one of the lead actors in a performance of Pagliacci. When Orsini was thought to have fled to Europe afterwards, the opera house closed down.

Years later, high school student Kate is plagued with nightmares after discovering she is Lorraine's daughter. Kate's best friend Monica convinces Kate to help restore the opera house, and when they arrive they meet the rest of the group including nerdy Cheryl "Walnut" Webber, flamboyant Marty, rebel George, vindictive Ashley and her jock boyfriend Taylor. The group are lectured by their teacher Ms. Gibby, but a stage light falls and nearly hits her, drawing the attention of the owner of the opera house Mr. Caruthers. The group deduces it was an accident; however, Mr. Caruthers insists the opera house is haunted by Lorraine, upsetting Kate who is comforted by Ms. Gibby. Soon after, Ms. Gibby leaves, allowing the teenagers to lock up, who instead engage in pizza and beers, before investigating Lorraine's murder scene. They find a patch of fresh blood, that causes Kate to have a vivid vision of her mother's death. While everyone else leaves, Monica consoles Kate, before the pair discover Lorenzo is Kate's father.

Ms. Gibby arrives the following morning, but is swiftly murdered with an axe by the killer, who is dressed like the clown that killed Lorraine. When the group arrive they begin cleaning, despite Ms. Gibby's absence. Ashley and Taylor sneak off to have sex, however Taylor ditches Ashley when they get into an argument, before the killer attacks Ashley and strangles her to death. Hearing the attack, Monica begins to investigate, only to find the clown who chases her until she reaches the rest of the group, where it is revealed that George dressed up as the clown to scare her. The group decide to try to locate the missing Ashley and Ms. Gibby, but while in the basement Monica is attacked by the clown who chases her and finally stabs her with a spear. Meanwhile, Kate attempts to phone the school but the phone is cut dead before she discovers they have become locked in the opera house. The group begin to panic and soon after find Ashley hung on the stage. Marty falls through a stage door, and Kate and George rush to save him, however he is electrocuted to death. Meanwhile, Taylor and Cheryl reach the roof to escape, but the clown grabs Taylor and throws him off the roof, killing him while Cheryl flees; however, she is soon decapitated.

Kate and George decide Lorenzo is not the killer, before they are split up. Kate runs to the auditorium and is chased by the clown onto a catwalk where she runs into Mr. Caruthers. Mr. Caruthers sends the clown over the catwalk, killing him, but Mr. Caruthers then turns on Kate and knocks her out. Kate awakes tied up in the auditorium with the victims bodies propped up on the seats. It is revealed Mr. Caruthers killed Lorraine because she denied him love, before another clown arrives and attacks him. In the panic, the clown is knocked out, but Kate breaks free and manages to kill Mr. Caruthers. The clown is revealed to be George, who was told by Kate's father, who had been living in the opera house, all about Mr. Caruthers before he had been killed on the catwalk. Kate and George then break free from the opera house.

== Cast ==
- Christopher Plummer as Harlan Caruthers
- Margot Kidder as Ellen Gibby
- Sarah Lassez as Kate Williams
- James Duval as George Reese
- Tatyana Ali as Monica
- Ryan Bittle as Taylor Marshall
- Melissa Galianos as Cheryl "Walnut" Webber
- J.P. Grimard as Marty Timmerman
- Liz Crawford as Ashley
- Vicki Marentette as Lorraine Sedgewick
- Jonathan Barrett as Lorenzo Orsini
- John Bluethner as Arnold Williams
- Pauline Broderick as Julia Williams

== Production ==
The movie was filmed in Winnipeg, Manitoba, Canada at the Burton Cummings Theatre in downtown Winnipeg. In one scene near the end of the film taking place on the rooftop, the Richardson Building and 201 Portage at Portage and Main can be seen.

== Home media ==
The film was released on VHS on August 31, 1999. The film was released as a double feature alongside Phantom Racer on October 5, 2010.
