= Roosters (film) =

- Directed by: Robert M. Young
- Written by: Milcha Sanchez-Scott
- Produced by: Susan Block-Reiner; Norman I. Cohen; Kevin Reidy
- Starring: Edward James Olmos; Sônia Braga; María Conchita Alonso; Sarah Lassez; Danny Nucci
- Cinematography: Reynaldo Villalobos
- Edited by: Arthur Coburn
- Music by: David Kitay
- Distributed by: IRS Media
- Release date: September 14, 1993
- Running time: 110 minutes
- Country: United States
- Language: English
- Box office: $148,919

Roosters is a 1993 American dramatic film with a screenplay by Milcha Sanchez-Scott that is adapted from her play of the same name. The film premiered at the Toronto International Film Festival in 1993 before being released in the United States in 1995.

== Plot ==
Gallo Morales (Olmos) returns home after being imprisoned for seven years for murdering a man over a cockfight. His family welcomes him back with mixed feelings. While his daughter Angela (Lassez) is eager to have him back, his son Hector (Nucci) feels otherwise. Hector desires to leave behind the farm and wants to use the family's prize-winning cock, which he has inherited from his grandfather, to win money in order to move his family away. However, Gallo has returned from prison determined to continue the business and to raise a new flock of roosters. Hector and Gallo soon clash over their differing goals.

== Cast ==
- Edward James Olmos as Gallo Morales
- Sônia Braga as Juana Morales
- María Conchita Alonso as Chata
- Danny Nucci as Hector Morales
- Sarah Lassez as Angela Estelle Morales
