= Sarah Lassez =

French-American-Canadian actress and author

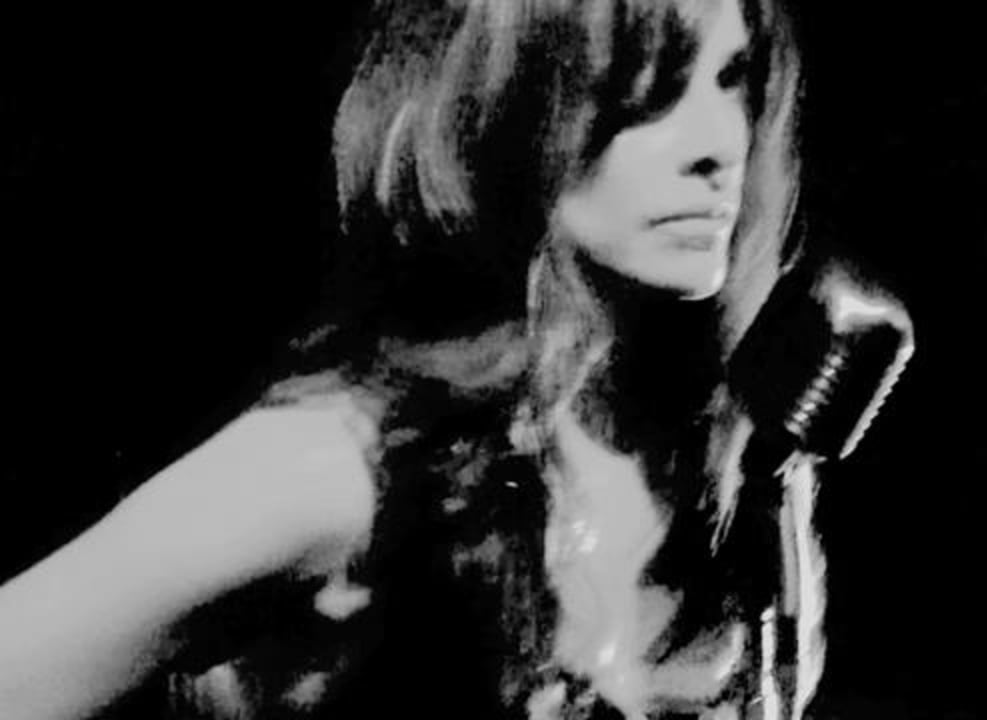
- Sarah Lassez singing in Los Angeles in 2011
- Born: Sherbrooke, Quebec, Canada
- Occupations: Actress, Author

Sarah Lassez is a French American and Canadian actress and writer. She was born in Canada on April 14, 1977 to French parents and raised in Australia. At the age of 14, she moved to New York City and currently lives in Los Angeles.

Sarah Lassez is best known for her work in Gregg Araki's Nowhere, Abel Ferrara's The Blackout and the underground cult hit Mad Cowgirl.

Her memoir, Psychic Junkie, was published by Simon & Schuster in the summer of 2006. It was featured on the cover of The New York Times Sunday Styles section, Entertainment Weekly, People Magazine and The Today Show. She had the lead role in the horror musical The Dead Inside, directed by Travis Betz.

== Selected filmography ==
- Roosters (1993)
- The Shaggy Dog (1994)
- Malicious (1995)
- Nowhere (1997)
- The Blackout (1997)
- The Clown at Midnight (1998)
- The Outfitters (1999)
- Sleeping Beauties (1999)
- Rien, Voila l'Ordre (2003)
- Until the Night (2004)
- Mad Cowgirl (2006)
- Lo (2008)
- Fade (2008)
- The Dead Inside (2011)
- Invaders from Proxima B (2023)
