= Diary of a Tired Black Man =

- DVD cover art
- Directed by: Tim Alexander
- Written by: Tim Alexander
- Produced by: Tim Alexander; David Gueringer; Mohsen Saeedy
- Starring: Jimmy Jean-Louis; Paula Lema; Natasha M. Dixon; Tim Alexander
- Cinematography: Tim Alexander
- Edited by: Tim Alexander
- Music by: Tim Alexander
- Distributed by: ScreenTime Films, Magnolia Pictures
- Release date: September 13, 2008 (Urbanworld Film Festival)
- Running time: 108 minutes
- Country: United States
- Language: English

Diary of a Tired Black Man is a 2008 independent film that combines elements of a comedy-drama with elements of a documentary film. It is the debut film of writer/director Tim Alexander.

== Plot ==
Diary of a Tired Black Man is a narrative dramatic-comedy that is also combined with documentary footage shot across the country. The scripted narrative portion centers around James (Jimmy Jean-Louis) and his wife Tonya (Paula Lema), and James' struggle to deal with his wife's outbursts of anger and antagonistic behavior.

The documentary portion of the film follows Tim Alexander as he goes around getting feedback, opinions and commentary from real-life African-American men and women in various cities across the United States about the challenges they deal with in their marriages and dating relationships.

== Cast ==
- Jimmy Jean-Louis as James
- Paula Lema as Tonya
- Natasha M. Dixon as Bridgette
- Kimmarie Johnson as Sexy Woman At Club (credited as Kim Marie Johnson)
- Tim Alexander as himself and the narrator
