= 3 Geezers! =

- Directed by: Michelle Schumacher
- Written by: Randle Schumacher; Eric Radzan; Tony Cummings
- Produced by: Randle Schumacher; Eric Radzan
- Starring: J. K. Simmons; Tim Allen; Mike O'Malley; Kevin Pollak; Scott Caan; Randy Couture; Sam Raimi; Breckin Meyer
- Music by: Rick Amezcua; Randle Schumacher
- Production company: Rubber Tree Productions
- Release date: May 22, 2013
- Country: United States
- Language: English
- Box office: $4,175

3 Geezers! is a 2013 American comedy film directed by Michelle Schumacher and starring her husband J. K. Simmons, alongside Tim Allen, Scott Caan, Breckin Meyer, Randy Couture and Basil Hoffman. It was the second collaboration between Allen and Couture, after both appeared in supporting roles in 2008’s Redbelt. It also marked the second collaboration between Allen and Simmons after appearing in 2010’s Crazy on the Outside.

== Premise ==
Follow actor J Kimball as he researches what it's like to be old for a role in an upcoming movie. When he meets the residents at The Coconuts convalescent home, he quickly discovers that his perceptions of the elderly may be off from today's reality. After being on the wrong end of some pranks, J enlists the help of his Hollywood friends to turn the tides. Mayhem ensues.

== Cast ==
- J. K. Simmons as J Kimball
- Basil Hoffman as Victor
- Tim Allen as Tim
- Scott Caan as Scott
- Lou Beatty Jr. as Bernard
- Breckin Meyer as Breckin
- Randy Couture as Randy
- Mike O'Malley as Mike
- Sam Raimi as Sam
- Kevin Pollak as Kevin
- Robin Bain as Kari
- Courtenay Taylor as Lisa
- Fernanda Romero as Tiffany
- Ruth Williamson as Art Instructor
- Daniel Montgomery as Assistant Game Master

== Reception ==
Critical reception for 3 Geezers! has been overwhelmingly negative. On Metacritic the film has a rating of 9 out of 100 based on 5 reviews, indicating “overwhelming dislike”.

News outlets such as the Los Angeles Times and The New York Times panned the film overall, with both reviewers criticizing the movie's humor as un-funny and the reviewer for the New York Times commented that "This film makes the dreadful TV show “Betty White's Off Their Rockers” seem sophisticated." The Hollywood Reporter echoed these sentiments, stating that "Barely managing to fill its brief running time despite its surfeit of smuttily vulgar gags, 3 Geezers! proves a less than subtle argument for euthanasia." Slant Magazine gave a slightly more positive review, remarking that the film's approach was "a creative one that makes the material easier to swallow, but it doesn't change the fact that this is basically a single joke on repeat for a stretched-out 80 minutes, and whether it's funny or well told is eventually beside the point."
