= Samurai Cop =

1991 film by Amir Shervan

- DVD cover
- Directed by: Amir Shervan
- Written by: Amir Shervan
- Produced by: Orlando Corradi; Amir Shervan
- Starring: Robert Z'Dar; Matt Hannon; Mark Frazer; Gerald Okamura
- Cinematography: Peter Palian
- Edited by: Ruben Zadurian; Amir Shervan
- Music by: Alan DerMarderosian
- Production company: Hollywood Royal Pictures
- Distributed by: Demel International Corporation; Cinema Epoch
- Release date: 1991
- Running time: 96 minutes
- Country: United States
- Language: English

Samurai Cop is a 1991 American direct-to-video action film written, co-produced, and directed by Amir Shervan and starring Robert Z'Dar, Matt Hannon, and Mark Frazer. It has attained a cult following.

== Plot ==
When a renegade Japanese gang known as the Katana takes control of the cocaine trade in Los Angeles, the Los Angeles Police Department transfers in Joe Marshall, a "samurai" policeman from the San Diego Police Department who has been "trained by the masters in Japan" and "speaks fluent Japanese". An attempted bust meets with failure after a bizarre car chase leads to multiple deaths, and the only witness is critically burned and unable to testify. Katana boss Fujiyama orders the injured Katana member to be executed and his head displayed on a piano to remind the Katana members of their code of silence. Joe and his partner, Frank Washington, confront the Katana at Carlos'n Charlie's on Sunset Boulevard and reprimand them for disobeying the law. When that fails, Fujiyama's right-hand man, Yamashita, wages war in the parking lot, executing his own men who fail to subdue Joe and Frank.

Joe seduces Fujiyama's gun moll, Jennifer, and they become intimate while several of his police comrades are tortured and killed by the Katana gang. Fujiyama kidnaps Jennifer and tortures her to extract information about Joe. Unable to contain his anger any longer, Captain Rohmer of the LAPD sanctions the assassination of every single Katana member. Joe and Frank head to Fujiyama's compound and gun down every living person, and a final sword battle between Joe and Yamashita ends the Katanas' reign of terror. At the end, Joe and Jennifer embrace again on the beach.

== Cast ==
- Matt Hannon as Joe Marshall
- Robert Z'Dar as Yamashita
- Mark Frazer as Frank Washington
- Cranston Komuro as Fujiyama
- Janis Farley as Jennifer
- Gerald Okamura as Okamura
- Dale Cummings as Captain Rohmer
- Melissa Moore as Peggy
- Jimmy Williams as Officer Carter
- Cameron as Henchwoman

== Production ==
The film moved into production within a week of Amir Shervan and ex-Sylvester Stallone bodyguard Matt Hannon's first meeting. Upon walking into Shervan's office for the first time, Hannon was told he was perfect and immediately handed the full script for the film. Despite the film being titled Samurai Cop, Hannon had no experience with weapons training, and all of his formal practice would be classified as mixed martial arts. All of the combat scenes were choreographed by martial arts expert Gerald Okamura or planned by the actors themselves, sometimes only fifteen minutes before the scene in question was filmed.

Filming took place over several months, starting in June 1990. When actor Hannon had considered shooting to be finished, he had his hair cut short, only to be told that further shooting was to be done. Shervan obtained a lady's wig for the actor, which appears in several close-up shots throughout the film.Hannon stated that he and several other actors became frustrated with the dialogue in the film, while also expressing frustration at the lack of multiple takes. Hannon admitted to intentionally ruining takes out of frustration, incorrectly assuming Shervan would not include them in the film. Hannon and Mark Frazer both assumed the film was finished before Shervan called them in for reshoots in early 1991.

Amir Shervan could not afford lighting for night shoots, so the entire film is set during the day. Shervan also only had access to a handful of prop firearms, with the same Ruger GP100 and Smith & Wesson Model 15 revolvers reappearing in the hands of multiple characters, whereas Joe's Taurus PT92 pistol is exclusive to a single character. Actors also wore their own clothes and drove their own cars. Much of the film was shot without sound and done with single takes. Shervan had to dub the voices months after production, but could not get many of the minor actors to return. Choosing to use his own voice, he warped it in post-production to sound different. His inability to do this correctly resulted in ADR with a heavily robotic sound. Both lead actors, Hannon and Frazer, also supplied much of the ADR. Hannon has stated in an interview with Red Letter Media that "Amir did about 80% of the ADR voices." During these ADR sessions, Amir would film much of the necessary pick-up shots, all from within the office.

== Release ==
Director/Producer Amir Shervan took the film to the American Film Market (AFM) in the hopes of finding a distributor to buy the final product and give it a proper release. The film was never given a proper theatrical release; however, Polish distributor Demel International Corporation released it in Europe on VHS. It was released on DVD by Media Blasters in 2004 and on DVD in 2013 and Blu-ray in 2014 by Cinema Epoch.

There were rumors that the initial released cut of Samurai Cop was a print that had been found in a castle. Gregory Hatanaka, the founder of Cinema Epoch, and the one who owns the rights to the initial Samurai Cop film, claimed that this story was only partially true. The original 35mm print of the film was discovered by an employee of Hatanaka's in a vault that was specifically meant to store reels of film and preserve them. It was assumed that Shervan had stored the print for Samurai Cop as well as a few of his other films in this vault where they were happened upon by chance.

== Reception and legacy ==
The film gained a following and achieved cult classic status due to its unintentional humor.

On March 25, 2016, Samurai Cop was released as a VOD title by RiffTrax. The RiffTrax edition received a two-day theatrical release in April 2017, provided by Fathom Events.

In April 2026, Samurai Cop was ranked the 10th best So bad it's good movie classic of all time by online entertainment publication, Collider.

=== Sequel ===
Gregory Hatanaka, founder of Cinema Epoch, produced and directed a sequel, Samurai Cop 2: Deadly Vengeance, which was released in 2015.
