= Devil in the Flesh (1998 film) =

- DVD cover
- Directed by: Steve Cohen
- Written by: Kelly Carlin-McCall; Steve Cohen; Robert McCall; Michael Michaud
- Story by: Kurt Anderson; Richard Brandes
- Produced by: Robert Baruc; John Fremes
- Starring: Rose McGowan; Alex McArthur; Peg Shirley; J.C. Brandy; Phil Morris; Robert Silver; Sherrie Rose; Ryan Bittle
- Production companies: Le Monde Entertainment; Unapix Films; Prostar Entertainment
- Distributed by: Le Monde Entertainment
- Release date: August 21, 1998
- Running time: 99 minutes
- Countries: United States; Canada
- Language: English

Devil in the Flesh is a 1998 American-Canadian direct-to-video erotic thriller film directed by Steve Cohen and starring Rose McGowan and Alex McArthur. The film was co-written by Cohen with Kelly Carlin-McCall, Robert McCall and Michael Michaud, based on a story by Kurt Anderson and Richard Brandes, and is not based on the twice-filmed Raymond Radiguet novel Le Diable au corps (The Devil in the Flesh). The film was also released under the title Dearly Devoted.

== Plot ==
A beautiful, troubled teenage girl, Debbie Strand, is being brought up by her previously estranged grandmother in Los Angeles after her mother and her mother's boyfriend die in a suspicious house fire. Her grandmother is an extremely strict, fundamentalist Christian who believes that her granddaughter is exactly like her mother. She forces Debbie to wear her mother's old clothes instead of buying her new ones, and Debbie abuses her grandmother by beating her with her walking cane. When she tells Debbie that she is putting her in a reform school, Debbie yanks her grandmother’s cane out of her hands and kills her with it.

Debbie becomes enthralled with Peter Rinaldi, an English teacher at her new school. However, Peter has a fiancée named Marilyn and strong scruples, so he rejects Debbie's repeated advances. Peter finds that his life is ruined and bodies are piling up. During the hectic climax, Debbie breaks into Marilyn's home with the intention of killing her. Peter realizes that Debbie has gone there and follows her. While he is on his way, Debbie confronts Marilyn, who attempts to flee through the kitchen, but is brought down by Debbie, who knocks her unconscious. As Debbie attempts to murder her, Peter rushes in and stops her. He arrives in time, saving Marilyn; however, Debbie stabs him in the shoulder. Shortly after, Peter is sent off in an ambulance and Debbie is arrested by the police.

== Cast ==
- Rose McGowan as Debbie Strand
- Alex McArthur as Peter Rinaldi
- Peg Shirley as Fiona Long
- Phil Morris as Detective Joe Rosales
- Robert Silver as Detective Phil Archer
- Sherrie Rose as Marilyn
- Ryan Bittle as Greg Straffer
- Julia Nickson as Anna Nakashi
- Rick Overton as Dr. Mileston
- J.C. Brandy as Janie Magray
- Wendy Robie as Principal Joyce Saunders
- Krissy Carlson as Meegan Wright
- Philip Boyd as Todd Sauser
- Milton James as Mr. Monsour
- Morgan DiStefano as Student
- Aloma Wright as Secretary
- Carrick O'Quinn as Motorcycle Cop
- Ed Berke as Fire Chief
- Tom Simmons as Fireman #2
- Ken Fording as Investigator
- James Jude Courtney as Mr. Roberts

== Sequel ==
A sequel titled Devil in the Flesh 2 was released in 2000, with actress Jodi Lyn O'Keefe replacing McGowan.
