= Ken Yasuda (bodybuilder) =

Japanese professional bodybuilder (1971–2023)

- Born: May 2, 1971; Kyoto, Japan
- Died: August 6, 2023 (aged 52); Los Angeles, California, U.S.
- Website: http://kenyasuda.com

Ken Yasuda (May 2, 1971 – August 6, 2023) was a Japanese professional bodybuilder. He was formerly a mixed martial arts head coach for the Tokyo Sabres of the International Fight League.

== Early life ==
Ken Yasuda was born in the Japanese city of Kyoto to a family that boasts 46 generations of samurai warriors. As a child Yasuda dreamed of becoming a pro baseball player, and was drafted as a pitcher by a major league team after high school. Yasuda chose instead to play baseball at the University of Southern California, where he developed a love of weight lifting and physical conditioning from fellow USC alum Mark McGwire. An injury to his pitching arm eventually forced Yasuda to abandon his dreams of pitching in the major leagues. Yasuda then became involved in bodybuilding.

== Baseball ==
Because he grew up in Japan, Yasuda was an avid baseball player. Despite being drafted by a major league team, he chose to earn a college degree at the University of Southern California and play baseball there. Always considered to be too short to pitch in the U.S., Yasuda began to weight train to increase his strength. It was during this time that Yasuda met baseball great Mark McGwire and began training with him. While at USC, Yasuda got a ligament injury to his pitching arm and could no longer play.

== Bodybuilding ==
After his arm injury, Yasuda focused full-time on his new passion, bodybuilding. He soon became the first Japanese man to become a Musclemania Professional Bodybuilder after taking Mr. Japan Title in his first Mr. Japan competition. He has always been a finalist in top bodybuilding competitions like Excalibur and Superbody World Championships, Mr. World Championships and Musclemania Professional World Championships. While competing he has beaten the current Mr. Universe, Mr. USA, and Mr. France.

== Acting ==
Yasuda has also appeared in several U.S. and Japanese films, including Cupid's Mistake (2001) and Just Another Romantic Wrestling Comedy (2006). In addition to appearing on TV and films, he has starred in numerous training videos including the series The Way of Samurai, The Punishment Workout with Tito Ortiz, The Ultimate Power Training with Don Frye, and the MMA training video series. Two documentaries have been made about Yasuda: The Last Samurai Standing (2003) and Ken Yasuda (2000).

== Mixed martial arts ==
Yasuda was the head coach of the International Fight League's Tokyo Sabres. He coaches striking and makes fight strategies, which led his team to be undefeated in the season of 2007. He also focuses on strength and conditioning training to help prevent injuries and maximize physical performance. In addition to the Tokyo Sabres, he trains MMA legends Don Frye and Kazuyuki Fujita. He has been a coach for Team Inoki and New Japan Pro-wrestling Federation: he has coached most of the top New Japan Pro-wrestlers including Shinsuke Nakamura, Yoshi Tatsu, Keiji Muto, etc. He now trains individual fighters of prominence and up and coming fighters as well in addition to other professional athletes including Ichiro Suzuki.

== Wrestling ==
Yasuda made an appearance as the guest ambassador for the Hiroshi Tanahashi vs. Tetsuya Naito match at New Japan Pro-Wrestling's Wrestle Kingdom 11 in Tokyo Dome on January 4, 2017.

== Death ==
Yasuda resided in Los Angeles, California. He died in his home on August 6, 2023, at the age of 52, from arteriosclerotic cardiovascular disease. A memorial was held in Santa Monica on October 15, 2023. Yasuda was inurned at Kyoto Amagase Memorial Park in Uji, Japan, as well as Woodlawn Memorial Cemetery in Santa Monica on May 2, 2024.
