= Violent Blue =

- Directed by: Gregory Hatanaka
- Written by: Gregory Hatanaka; T.L. Young
- Produced by: Gregory Hatanaka; Bogdan Szumilas; Silvia Šuvadová; Clinton H. Wallace; T.L. Young; Madla Hruza; James Avallone
- Starring: Silvia Šuvadová; Jesse Hlubik; Nick Mancuso; Barry O'Rourke; Andrea Harrison; Garret Sato
- Cinematography: Yasu Tanida; James Avallone; Spike Hasegawa; Ramzi Abed
- Edited by: B.N. Lindstrom
- Music by: Toshiyuki Hiraoka
- Distributed by: Cinema Epoch
- Release date: January 7, 2011
- Running time: 129 minutes
- Languages: English; Polish

Violent Blue is a feature drama released in 2011 directed by Gregory Hatanaka and starring Silvia Šuvadová, Jesse Hlubik, and Nick Mancuso. Portions of the film are silent with intertitles accompanied with an original music score by Toshiyuki Hiraoka. It was simultaneously shot in English, Polish, and Czech language versions.

== Plot ==
Katarina is a music teacher intent on completing and uncovering the secret behind an unfinished music symphony. She worries about her brother, Ondrej, an introverted electronics inventor who finds himself falling in love with the mysterious student who lives downstairs. His work is being financed by a nefarious tycoon named Bolo. When Katarina's ex-husband Pietro shows up and imprisons her, locking the woman up in a cage, her brother must question whether to sacrifice himself in order to free her.

== Cast ==
- Silvia Šuvadová as Katarina
- Jesse Hlubik as Ondrej
- Nick Mancuso as Pietro
- Barry O'Rourke as Bolo
- Andrea Harrison as Kylie
- Bogdan Szumilas as Dr. Sobeslav
