= Matt Hannon =

American actor

- Born: Mathew J. Hannon
- Other name: Mathew Karedas
- Occupation: Actor
- Years active: 1988–1996; 2014–present
- Children: 1

Mathew Karedas (born Mathew J. Hannon) is an American actor, best known for his role as Joe Marshall in the 1991 cult film Samurai Cop, and its 2015 sequel Samurai Cop 2: Deadly Vengeance.

== Career ==
Mathew Karedas was one of Sylvester Stallone's bodyguards during the late 1980s. This subsequently inspired him to pursue acting. "In Sly's world, it's a very rarefied air for the very wealthy – it's intoxicating. At that time, he'd just finished Rambo III and Tango & Cash and spending all that time hanging out with all these celebrities, I decided I wanted to have at least 1% of what he had!"

Karedas was unable to get any substantial roles after Samurai Cop and withdrew from the entertainment industry for two decades. In 1992, he took part in an armed robbery stealing a Rembrandt painting from televangelist Gene Scott's University Cathedral in Los Angeles. The painting was found in the home of Kourosh Jadali, a stunt coordinator who worked on the set of Samurai Cop. Karedas was later arrested and sent to prison. He was largely unaware of the cult status that Samurai Cop had attained.

Karedas has stated that he would check his IMDb page and noticed that many people assumed that he was dead, although this may have been due to him legally changing his surname to Karedas in the early-1990s. Karedas stated in an interview with Red Letter Media that he was satisfied with the public thinking he was dead. He would regain attention when his daughter uploaded a video to YouTube of him saying that he was indeed alive. He has since returned to acting, reprising his role as Joe Marshall in the 2015 film Samurai Cop 2: Deadly Vengeance. He was connected to Len Kabasinski's 2022 action film Pact of Vengeance which also stars Leo Fong but ultimately did not appear. On August 19, 2023, Hannon expressed his desire to join the circus in an Instagram post. It is unclear whether he has followed up on this desire, as he has not posted to Instagram since then.

== Personal life ==
He resides in Calabasas, California, with his wife and daughter.

== Filmography ==
=== Film ===
Year	Title	Role
1988	American Revenge	Angelo
1991	Samurai Cop	Joe Marshall
2015	Samurai Cop 2: Deadly Vengeance	Joe Marshall

=== Television ===
Year	Title	Role	Notes
1995	JAG	Serbian soldier	Episode: "A New Life: Part 2"
