= Cupid's Mistake =

2001 film by Young Man Kang

Cupid’s Mistake
- Poster art
- Directed by: Young Man Kang
- Written by: Young Man Kang
- Produced by: Gregory Hatanaka; Young Man Kang
- Starring: Everado Gil; Susan Petry; Toya Cho; Ken Yasuda
- Cinematography: Doo H. Lee
- Edited by: Bryan Kim
- Music by: Oliver Lyon
- Distributed by: Phaedra Cinema; Vanguard Cinema
- Release date: August 24, 2001
- Running time: 70 minutes
- Country: United States
- Language: English
- Budget: $980

Cupid's Mistake is a 2001 comedy film directed by Young Man Kang, a Korean-born filmmaker who made his U.S. directing debut with this production. The film is notable for being produced for $980, which was recognized by the Guinness Book of World Records as being the least expensive feature-length motion picture to receive a theatrical film release.

== Plot ==
The film is set in Venice Beach, California, and it centers on four young people in the midst of romantic entanglements. The actress Susan (Susan Petry) is in love with the video producer Gil (Everardo Gil), but he is in love with the model Toya (Toya Cho). However, Toya is in love with the bodybuilder Ken (Ken Yasuda). But Ken has his eyes on Susan.

== Production and release ==
Cupid’s Mistake was shot entirely on digital video, which enabled Kang to bring in the entire production for only $980. The film was mostly improvised by the cast, who worked from a story outline created by Kang. As the filmmaker told an interviewer for IndieRag: "(We had) three days of crazy filming. No permits, guerrilla shooting, no script, [and] 100% improvised. Handheld shooting with long continuous shots made Cupid both cost effective and easy to edit."

Although the film was picked up for commercial release by the distribution company Phaedra Cinema, it played only in venues that provided digital video projection. In a 2001 interview, Kang explained the problems in bringing his work to audiences: “Only a few theaters have video projectors, thus, it is extremely difficult to find a theater in which one can show their film. I need to transfer to 35mm print, but it costs at least $40,000. It's difficult to make that amount of money back from art house distribution. That's why my film distribution company doesn't want to take the risk.”

Cupid’s Mistake had its theatrical release on August 24, 2001, in New York City, and critical reaction was mixed. David Sterritt, writing for The Christian Science Monitor, noted the film's “acting is uneven and most of the romancing seems so mismatched that it's not surprising when things fall apart time after time. But there are appealing moments along the way, and the director gets impressive mileage with a budget that can only be called minuscule.” However, Dave Kehr, writing for The New York Times, complained: “Mr. Kang has discovered the effects button on his camcorder, and he relies upon it to provide what style his work has: a pixilated movement here, a fade to monochrome there. At 70 minutes, "Cupid's Mistake" is short, but then, so is our time on this planet.” And Ken Fox, writing for TV Guide Online, noted: “Wearing its $980 price tag as a badge of honor, writer-director Young Man Kang's no-budget video feature proves two things: You don't need a multimillion dollar budget to make a film, and sometimes you get exactly what you pay for.”

Cupid’s Mistake was released on DVD on July 21, 2009, by Vanguard Cinema.
