= Girl Lost =

- Directed by: Robin Bain
- Written by: Robin Bain
- Produced by: Robin Bain; Leah Cevoli; John Swon
- Starring: Jessica Taylor Haid; Felix Ryan; Robin Bain; Emily Cheree; Irena Stemer; Misha Suvorov; James Seaman
- Cinematography: Ian Campbell
- Edited by: Louie Cohen; lead editor Ian Campbell
- Music by: Anoice; Takahiro Kido
- Distributed by: Cinema Epoch
- Release dates: May 26, 2016 (IFS Film Festival); May 2018 (Amazon Prime Video)
- Running time: 95 minutes
- Country: United States
- Language: English

Girl Lost is a 2016 American drama film written and directed by Robin Bain.

Girl Lost was filmed on location in Los Angeles, California and was released by Cinema Epoch on Amazon Prime Video in 2018. The film quickly became the #1 trending movie on Amazon Prime Video in June 2018. In addition, Girl Lost held the position as the #1 most popular movie on Tubi during the months of June and July 2018.

Beyond the film's domestic release, Girl Lost has been released internationally in the United Kingdom, Germany and Japan.

== Plot ==
Girl Lost explores underage prostitution in the seedy underbelly of Hollywood. The film brings to light the very real tragedy of sex trafficking in the United States.

Girl Lost follows the life of 15-year-old, Shara. After being sexually abused by her mother's boyfriend, Shara runs away with her street hustler boyfriend, Jamie. Jamie and Shara struggle to survive in Los Angeles, but ultimately, they fail. Finding herself homeless and alone, the wayward teen turns to the only option she believes she has... Selling her body and her soul. Shara begins working as a prostitute in a back-alley Russian brothel with other underage girls and her life begins to unravel.

== Cast ==
- Jessica Taylor Haid as Shara
- Felix Ryan as Jamie
- Robin Bain as Kim
- Emily Cheree Dye as Bridgette
- James Seaman as Louie
- Irena Stemer as Madame Yeva
- Misha Suvorov as Sero
- Evana Alexeeva as Alin
- Daniel Wojack as Stosh

== Film development ==
Girl Lost was partially funded on Kickstarter under the working title Nowhereland. Cinema Epoch, the film's distribution company, changed the name to Girl Lost upon the release of the film in 2018.

== Critical reception ==
The film received a 5/5 star rating from reviewer FilmFervor.com in which the article states, "This is just an amazing film. Perfectly executed in every way. Outstanding."

While still in development and raising funds on Kickstarter, Girl Lost, under the working title, Nowhereland, was honored as "Project of the Day" on IndieWire.

== Girl Lost: A Hollywood Story ==
A second Girl Lost film, Girl Lost: A Hollywood Story written, directed, produced and edited by Robin Bain was released by Breaking Glass Pictures on December 1, 2020, on Amazon Prime Video in the United States.

=== Awards ===
Year	Association	Category	Work	Result
2016	23rd Annual IFS Los Angeles Film Festival	Best Picture	Nowhereland	Won
2016	23rd Annual IFS Los Angeles Film Festival	Best Dramatic Feature Film	Nowhereland	Won
2016	23rd Annual IFS Los Angeles Film Festival	Audience Choice Award	Nowhereland	Won
2016	Accolade Global Film Competition	Award of Recognition, Dramatic Impact	Nowhereland	Won
2016	Accolade Global Film Competition	Award of Recognition, Women Filmmakers	Nowhereland	Won
2016	Accolade Global Film Competition	Award of Recognition, Writing - Robin Bain	Nowhereland	Won
2016	Accolade Global Film Competition	Award of Recognition, Direction - Robin Bain	Nowhereland	Won
2016	The IndieFEST Film Awards	Award of Recognition, Women Filmmakers	Nowhereland	Won
2016	The IndieFEST Film Awards	Award of Recognition, Writing - Robin Bain	Nowhereland	Won
2016	The IndieFEST Film Awards	Award of Recognition, Direction - Robin Bain	Nowhereland	Won
2017	Los Angeles Film Review Independent Film Awards	Silver Award, Writer & Director - Robin Bain	Nowhereland	Won
2017	Guerilla MovieMaking Awards (GMMA) Festival	Best Film, Director - Robin Bain	Nowhereland	Won
2019	Brufifest Brujo's Film Festival	Best Director - Robin Bain	Girl Lost	Won
