= Amir Shervan =

Iranian filmmaker (1929–2006)

- امیر شروان
- Born: Amir-Hossein Ghaffari; May 24, 1929; Tehran, Imperial State of Persia
- Died: November 1, 2006 (aged 77); Los Angeles, California, U.S.
- Occupations: Film director, film producer, actor, screenwriter
- Years active: 1949–1991

Amir Shervan (Persian: امیر شروان), born Amir-Hossein Ghaffari (Persian: اميرحسين غفاری; May 24, 1929 – November 1, 2006), was an Iranian film director, producer, actor, and screenwriter.

== Biography ==
After studying theatre in Pasadena, California, he returned to his home country, Iran, and had a prolific cinema career that began with Parviz Khatibi's 1949 film Vaareite Bahari (واریته بهاری). all the way to his own directorial debut Torkaman.

As a result of the Iranian Revolution, many Iranian films were censored or "purified" by the government, making it difficult for any films without a pro-Islamic angle to be made. This halted his filmmaking career, so he relocated to California in 1980. Between 1980 and 1987, Shervan worked to build his production company, Hollywood Royal Productions, where he aimed to make American action films, taking influence from other massive hits of the 1980s, primarily Lethal Weapon.

From 1987 to 1992, Shervan produced and directed several action films including Hollywood Cop, Killing American Style, and Samurai Cop, which starred Matt Hannon and Robert Z'Dar. Many of the same locations are used throughout his films. For example, the estate that the majority of Killing American Style is set on, is the same building that the climax of both Samurai Cop and Hollywood Cop is set at. Shervan was known to cut the budget in other places, such as filming all of his movies during the day to avoid buying lighting equipment to use for the night sequences, or using his own production van for car chase sequences.

After Samurai Cop in 1991, Shervan retired from filmmaking. Not much is known about his career outside of that. He died in 2006, before his last film would find cult acclaim on the internet.

Samurai Cop was restored in a brand new HD transfer for theatrical and DVD release by distributor Cinema Epoch in 2013, the Blu-ray release came out in 2014. Cinema Epoch will also release Shervan's other works, including Killing American Style, Young Rebels, and Gypsy in restored versions.

== Filmography ==
Year	Title	Director	Writer	Producer	Editor	Note	Ref
1974	Torkaman	Yes	No	No	No		
1976	Antar o Mantar	Yes	No	No	No		
1986	Hollywood Cop	Yes	Yes	No	Yes		
1988	Killing American Style	Yes	Yes	Yes	Yes		
1989	Young Rebels	Yes	Yes	Yes	Yes		
1990	Gypsy	Yes	Yes	Yes	Yes	Co-written with Carol Dickey	
1991	Samurai Cop	Yes	Yes	Yes	Yes		
