= Robin Bain =

American actress, writer and director

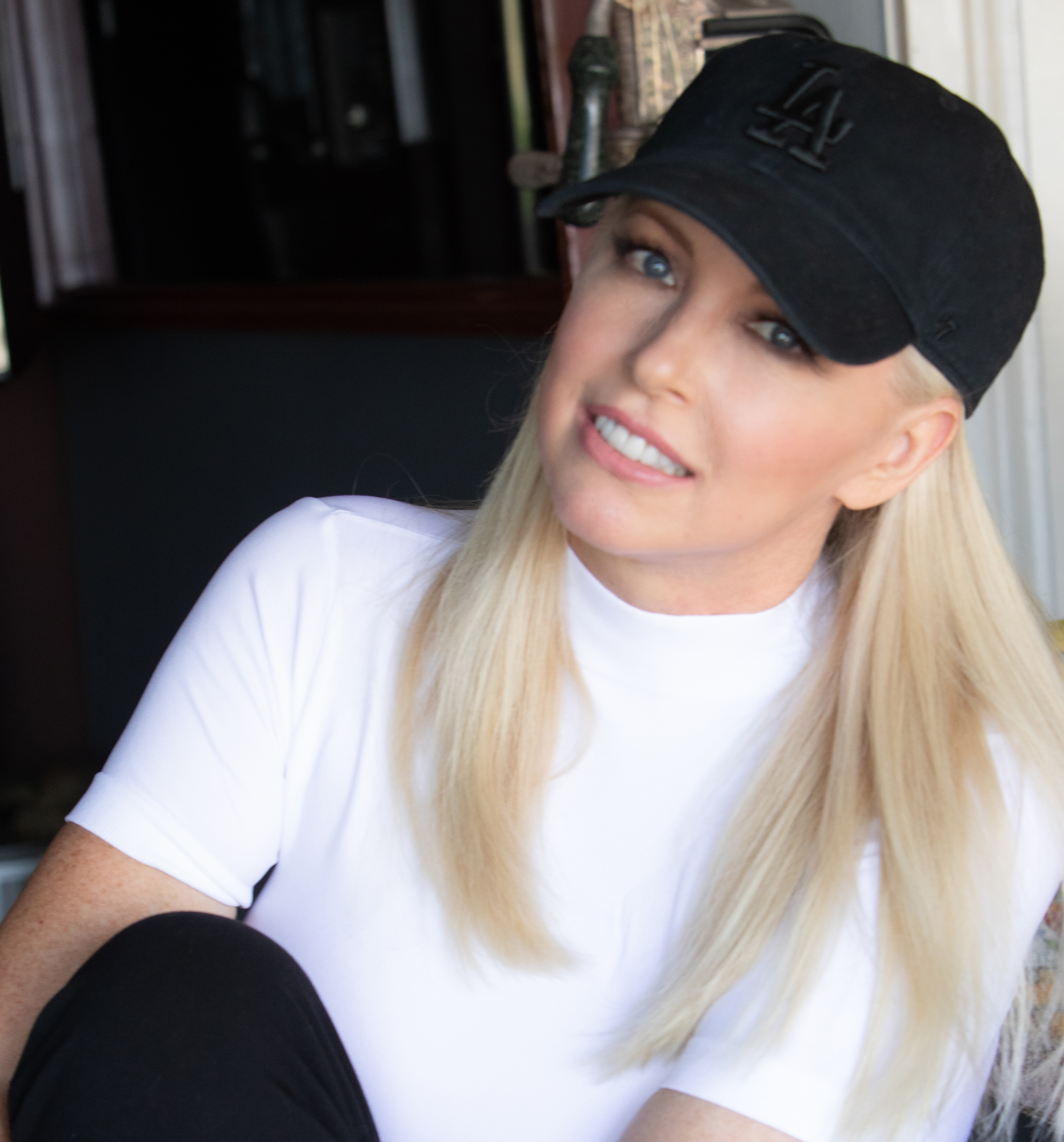
- Education: University of Southern California
- Occupations: Director; writer; producer
- Years active: 2001–present

Robin Bain is an American film director, writer, producer, and former actress.

== Career ==
=== Early work ===
Robin Bain is a graduate of the University of Southern California and holds a Bachelor of Arts degree in Theater from the USC School of Dramatic Arts. Bain appeared in Playboy in 2002 and was named as one of Playboy Magazine's Rising Stars in 2008. Bain went on to perform as an actress on the NBC comedy series, The Real Wedding Crashers, Comedy Central's Mind of Mencia and alongside Gene Simmons in a commercial promoting his television series, Gene Simmons Family Jewels. Bain then made guest appearances on The Tonight Show with Jay Leno and Real Time with Bill Maher.

Bain acted as a live-action character on Seth Green's Emmy Award-winning animated show Robot Chicken, which airs on the Cartoon Network's Adult Swim. She also voiced multiple characters for the 2009 Robot Chicken Christmas special.

=== Writer and director ===
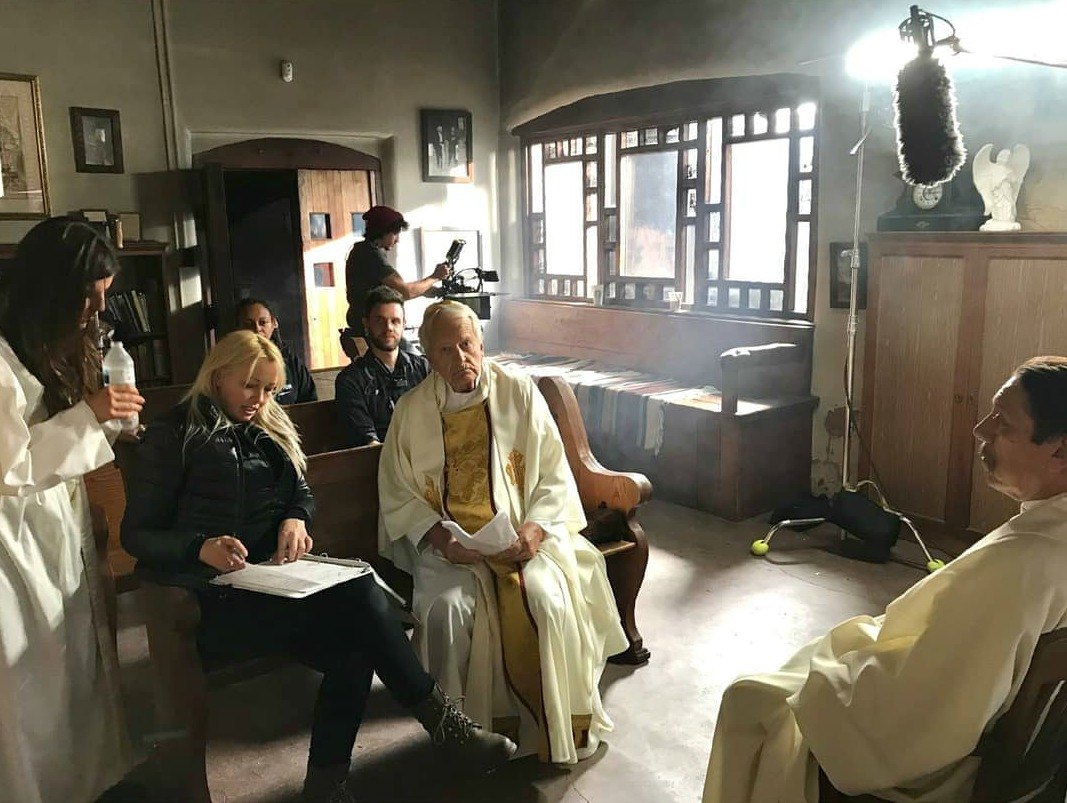
Director, Robin Bain behind the scenes on the set of "The Last Exorcist".

Robin Bain wrote, directed and produced the independent film, Girl Lost, which speaks on the harsh realities of sex trafficking in the United States. Girl Lost was released on Amazon Prime Video in May 2018. Bain released a second Girl Lost film as a director, writer, producer and editor entitled Girl Lost: A Hollywood Story. The film is part of Bain's continued effort to bring awareness to the pitfalls of the sex industry in Los Angeles. Girl Lost: A Hollywood Story was released on Amazon Prime Video on December 1, 2020. by Breaking Glass Pictures.

Bain directed the feature film, The Last Exorcist starring Danny Trejo and Rachele Brooke Smith in 2020. In 2023, Bain wrote, directed and produced the feature film Girls on Film, which was released by Breaking Glass Pictures and debuted as the number one New Release in the LGBT category on Amazon Prime Video.

Robin Bain is an advocate for female filmmakers and is a member of the Alliance of Women Directors. Bain is also an author for Ms. In The Biz, a website dedicated to female filmmakers. Bain often gears her writing toward controversial subjects regarding women in the film industry.

== Personal life ==
Bain is skilled with firearms. Bain's father served as a physician in the United States Army. She resides in Los Angeles, California.

== Filmography ==
Title	Year	Role	Notes
The Larry Sanders Show	1997	Swimsuit model	TV series
Extra	1997	Swimsuit model	TV series
Glam	1997	Restaurant patron	
Frankenbabe	2001	Frankenbabe	
Self Righteous Suicide	2002		Director, writer, producer, cinematographer
Paper Doll	2003	Natasha	Director, writer, producer
Monster House	2003	Actress	Cable TV series, Discovery Channel, 1 episode, Las Vegas House
Wishful Thinking	2004		Director, writer, producer, cinematographer
The Real Wedding Crashers	2007	Robin	Network TV series, NBC
Mind of Mencia	2007	Sketch comedy player	Cable TV series, Comedy Central
The Tonight Show with Jay Leno	2008	Sketch comedy player	Network TV series, NBC
Real Time with Bill Maher	2008	Sketch comedy player	Cable TV series, HBO
Robot Chicken	2008–2009	Herself; additional voices	Cable TV series, Adult Swim, 2 episodes "President Evil", "Dear Consumer or Robot Chicken's Full-Assed Christmas Special"
Eat Cake	2010	Sheila	Director, writer, producer
Nowhere to Run	2010	Claudia	Director, writer, producer, cinematographer
The Brides of Sodom	2010	Sandy	
Hollywood Sex Wars	2011	Julie Cantalopez	Cameo appearance
Geezers!	2012	Kari	
Pop Star	2013		Writer
The Cheater	2015	Candy	Short film
EuroClub	2016	Tiffany	
Girl Lost	2018	Kim	Director, writer, producer
The Last Exorcist	2020		Director, writer
Girl Lost: A Hollywood Story	2020		Director, writer, producer, editor
Girls on Film	2023		Director, writer, producer

== Awards and nominations ==
Year	Association	Category	Work	Result
2003	SMMASH Film Festival	Best Short	Paper Doll	Won
2003	SMMASH Film Festival	Best Director - Robin Bain	Paper Doll	Nominated
2003	SMMASH Film Festival	Best Actress - Robin Bain	Paper Doll	Nominated
2003	California Independent Film Festival	Official Selection	Paper Doll	Nominated
2016	23rd Annual IFS Los Angeles Film Festival	Best Picture	Nowhereland	Won
2016	23rd Annual IFS Los Angeles Film Festival	Best Dramatic Feature Film	Nowhereland	Won
2016	23rd Annual IFS Los Angeles Film Festival	Audience Choice Award	Nowhereland	Won
2016	Accolade Global Film Competition	Award of Recognition, Dramatic Impact	Nowhereland	Won
2016	Accolade Global Film Competition	Award of Recognition, Women Filmmakers	Nowhereland	Won
2016	Accolade Global Film Competition	Award of Recognition, Writing - Robin Bain	Nowhereland	Won
2016	Accolade Global Film Competition	Award of Recognition, Direction - Robin Bain	Nowhereland	Won
2016	The IndieFEST Film Awards	Award of Recognition, Women Filmmakers	Nowhereland	Won
2016	The IndieFEST Film Awards	Award of Recognition, Writing - Robin Bain	Nowhereland	Won
2016	The IndieFEST Film Awards	Award of Recognition, Direction - Robin Bain	Nowhereland	Won
2017	Los Angeles Film Review Independent Film Awards	Silver Award, Writer & Director - Robin Bain	Nowhereland	Won
2017	Guerilla MovieMaking Awards (GMMA) Festival	Best Film, Director - Robin Bain	Nowhereland	Won
2019	Brufifest Brujo's Film Festival	Best Director - Robin Bain	Girl Lost	Won
