= Mad Cowgirl =

- Directed by: Gregory Hatanaka
- Written by: Gregory Hatanaka; Norith Soth
- Produced by: Edwin A. Santos
- Starring: Sarah Lassez; James Duval; Walter Koenig; Devon Odessa; Jaason Simmons
- Cinematography: Spike Hasegawa; James Avallone
- Edited by: B.N. Lindstrom
- Distributed by: Cinema Epoch
- Release date: July 19, 2006
- Running time: 89 minutes
- Country: United States
- Language: English

Mad Cowgirl is a low-budget film by Gregory Hatanaka released in 2006. Hatanaka dedicated the movie to Doris Wishman, who directed 1960s sexploitation films such as Diary of a Nudist, Behind the Nudist Curtain and Bad Girls Go to Hell, and actor John Cassavetes. Mad Cowgirl officially was selected to the SF Indiefest and the Silverlake Film Festival, followed by a limited release in major cities such as New York City and Seattle. Mad Cowgirl was released on DVD on December 5, 2006.

== Plot ==
The central character in Mad Cowgirl is Therese, a meat inspector who is dying of a brain disorder. The film follows Therese on her surreal descent into violence, in which men in her life become the Ten Tigers of Canton that she must kill in order to become a better woman.

Victims of Therese's violent surreal madness include her meatpacking brother Thierry, naughty Pastor Dylan, and a Sri Lankan doctor.

== Cast ==
- Sarah Lassez — Therese
- James Duval — Thierry
- Devon Odessa — Aimee
- Walter Koenig — Pastor Dylan
- Linton Semage — Dr. Suzuki
- Vic Chao — Charlie
- Christo DiMassis - Confessional Priest
- Douglas Dunning - Miles Graham
- Jaason Simmons - Jonathan Hunter
- Luke Y. Thompson - Big Brother Cheng
- Katie Weaver - Cindy
- Lucie Duval - Mother
- Willard Morgan - Paul, the producer
- Christopher Ogilvie - Leo
- Ron Becks - Pastor Johnson
- Jeff Milne - Willard
