= Big Bear Lake International Film Festival =

Film festival in Big Bear Lake, California

- Location: Big Bear Lake, California
- Founded: 2000
- Website: bigbearfilmfestival.com

The Big Bear International Film Festival was held in the mountain community of Big Bear Lake, California, from 2000–2014; every year, the festival expanded in its number of submissions and the prestige of their honorees, the festival hosted both film and screenplay competitions.
