= Lists of films by location =

The following lists of films by location are classified by the geographic area in which the films were set or shot:

== Africa ==
- Algeria
- Angola
- Benin
- Burkina Faso
- Cameroon
- Central African Republic
- Chad
- Democratic Republic of the Congo
- Republic of the Congo
- Egypt (ancient)
- Ethiopia
- Gabon
- Guinea
- Ivory Coast
- Kenya
- Mali
- Mauritania
- Mauritius
- Morocco (shot in)
- Mozambique
- Niger
- Nigeria
- South Africa
- Tunisia
- Zambia
- Zimbabwe

== Asia ==
- Afghanistan
- Armenia
- Azerbaijan
  - Baku (shot in)
- Bangladesh
- Bhutan
- Cambodia
- China
  - Shanghai (set in)
  - Hong Kong
  - Macau (set in)
- Georgia
- India
  - Bijapur (shot in)
  - Patna (set in)
  - Rajasthan (shot in)
  - Varanasi (shot in)
- Indonesia
- Iran (set in)
- Iraq
- Israel
- Japan (set in)
- Jordan
- Kazakhstan
- Korea
- Kyrgyzstan
- Lebanon
- Malaysia
- Maldives
- Mongolia
- Myanmar (set in)
- Nepal
- Oman
- Pakistan
  - Lahore (set in)
- Palestine
- The Philippines (shot in)
- Saudi Arabia
- Singapore (set in)
- Sri Lanka
- Syria
- Thailand (shot in)
- Turkmenistan
- Turkey
- United Arab Emirates
- Uzbekistan
- Vietnam

== Europe ==
- Albania
- Andorra
- Armenia
- Austria
  - Vienna (set in)
- Belarus
- Belgium
- Bosnia and Herzegovina
- Bulgaria
- Croatia
- Cyprus
- Czechia
- Czechoslovakia
  - Prague (shot in)
- Denmark
- Estonia
- Finland
- France
  - Lyon (set in)
  - Marseille (set in)
  - Paris (set in)
    - Palace of Versailles (shot in)
- Germany
  - Berlin (set in)
- Greece (ancient)
- Greenland
- Hungary
  - Budapest (shot in)
- Iceland (shot in)
- Ireland (set in)
- Italy
  - Rome (set in; ancient)
  - Sicily (set in)
- Latvia
- Liechtenstein
- Lithuania
- Malta (set in; shot in)
- Moldova
- Netherlands
  - Amsterdam (set in)
  - Delft (set in)
- North Macedonia
- Norway
- Poland
  - Warsaw (set in)
- Portugal (set in)
- Romania (shot in)
- Russia
- Serbia
- Slovakia
- Slovenia
- Soviet Union
- Spain
  - Almería (shot in)
  - Barcelona (set in)
  - Costa Brava (shot in)
  - Madrid (set in)
- Sweden
- Switzerland
- Ukraine
- United Kingdom
  - Brighton (set in)
  - Glasgow (set in)
  - Liverpool (shot in)
  - London
    - British Museum (shot in)
  - Northern Ireland (set in)
  - Oxford (shot in)
  - Wales (set in)
- Yugoslavia

== Latin America ==
- Argentina
- Bolivia
- Brazil
  - Rio de Janeiro (set in)
- Chile
- Colombia (set in)
- Costa Rica
- Ecuador
- Guatemala
- Mexico
- Nicaragua
- Paraguay
- Peru
- Uruguay
- Venezuela

== North America ==
=== Canada ===
- British Columbia
  - BC Interior (shot in)
  - Coquitlam (shot in)
  - Vancouver (shot in)
  - Victoria (shot in)
- Manitoba
  - Winnipeg (shot in)
- Ontario
  - Hamilton (shot in)
  - Toronto (set in; shot in)
- Quebec
  - Montreal (shot in)

=== United States ===
- Alaska (set in)
- Arizona (shot in)
  - Monument Valley (shot in)
- California
  - Big Bear Valley (shot in)
  - Lone Pine (shot in)
  - Los Angeles (set in)
  - Northern California (shot in)
  - Palm Springs (set in; shot in)
  - Riverside (shot in)
  - San Diego (set in; shot in)
  - San Francisco (set in)
  - Santa Catalina Island (set in)
  - Sonora, California (shot in)
  - Thousand Oaks (shot in)
  - Vasquez Rocks (shot in)
- Florida (shot in)
  - Miami (set in)
  - Tampa (set in)
- Hawaii (set in)
- Illinois
  - Chicago (set in)
- Kansas (set in)
- Michigan
  - Detroit (set in)
- Minnesota
- New England (set in)
  - Boston (set in)
  - Stamford, Connecticut (shot in)
- New Jersey (set in)
- New Mexico (shot in)
- New York
  - Long Island (shot in)
  - New York City (set in)
    - Harlem (shot in)
    - Statue of Liberty
- Nevada
  - Las Vegas (set in)
- Oregon (set in; shot in)
- Pennsylvania (shot in)
  - Harrisburg
  - Lehigh Valley (shot in)
  - Pittsburgh (shot in)
- Puerto Rico (set in)
- Southern United States (set in)
  - Baltimore (shot in)
  - Charleston, South Carolina (set in)
  - Dallas (set in)
  - Houston (set in)
  - Huntington, West Virginia (set in)
  - New Orleans (set in)
  - Washington, D.C. (set in)
- Washington
  - Seattle (shot in)

=== Caribbean ===
- The Bahamas (shot in)
- Cuba
- Dominican Republic
- French Guiana
  - Devil's Island (set in)
- Guadeloupe
- Haiti
- Jamaica
- Martinique (shot in)
- Trinidad and Tobago

== Oceania ==
- Australia (set in)
  - Adelaide (shot in)
  - Alice Springs (shot in)
  - Brisbane (shot in)
  - Darwin (shot in)
  - Gold Coast (shot in)
  - Melbourne (shot in)
  - Queensland (shot in)
  - Sydney (set in; shot in)
  - Tasmania (shot in)
  - Western Australia (shot in)
- New Zealand (set in)
  - Dunedin

== See also ==
- The categories Films by setting and Films by shooting location
- List of films set on Mars
