= List of films set in New Jersey =

This is a list of movies set or partially set in the U.S. state of New Jersey:

- 13th Child (2002) - shot in New Jersey at Wharton State Forest, Batsto Village, and Hammonton in the Pine Barrens
- According to Greta (2009) - Ocean Grove, NJ - Asbury Park, NJ - Brick Township, NJ - Neptune, NJ - Point Pleasant, NJ
- Across the Universe (2007) - Princeton University campus
- The Addams Family (2019)
- The Adventures of Buckaroo Banzai Across the 8th Dimension (1984)
- A.I. Artificial Intelligence (2001)
- Alice, Sweet Alice (1976)
- American Gangster (2007)
- American Hustle (2013)
- The Amityville Horror (1979) - set in Long Island but partially filmed in Toms River
- Analyze That (2002)
- Analyze This (1999) - partially filmed in Hoboken, Jersey City, Montclair
- Annie (1982)
- Aqua Teen Hunger Force Colon Movie Film for Theaters (2007)
- Artie Lange's Beer League (2006)
- Atlantic City (1944)
- Atlantic City (1980)
- Avengers: Endgame (2019)
- Baby It's You (1983)
- Bad Company (2002)
- Ball of Fire (1941): mostly set in NYC, the inn where the main characters stay is in Kingston, New Jersey; their expected wedding venue is in Rancocas.
- Bathing Beauty (1944)
- Batman (1943) - The fictitious Gotham City is located in New Jersey.
- Batman (1966)
- Batman (1989)
- The Batman (2022)
- Batman and Robin (1949)
- Batman and Robin (1997)
- Batman Begins (2005)
- Batman Forever (1995)
- Batman Returns (1992)
- Batman v Superman: Dawn of Justice (2016)
- Be Kind Rewind (2008)
- Beaches (1988)
- A Beautiful Mind (2001)
- Before I Self Destruct (2009)
- Being John Malkovich (1999) - "You see the world through John Malkovich's eyes. Then after about 15 minutes, you're spit out into a ditch on the side of the New Jersey Turnpike!"
- Big (1988) - parts were filmed in Cliffside Park
- Big Top Scooby-Doo! (2012)
- Birdy (1984)
- Blinded by the Light (2019) - scenes set/filmed in Freehold and Asbury Park
- Bogus (1996)
- The Bounty Hunter (2010) - filmed partially in Atlantic City
- Brainscan (1994)
- Brewster's Millions (1985)
- Broadway Danny Rose (1984)
- Bruised (2020)
- The Burglar (1957)
- Burn After Reading (2008) - partially filmed in Paramus (gym scenes - Route 17)
- The Card Counter (2021)
- The Cartel (2010)
- Caught (1996) - Jersey City
- Chasing Amy (1997)
- Cheaper by the Dozen (1950)
- Cinderella Man (2005)
- City by the Sea (2002) - Asbury Park
- City of Hope (1991) - takes place in fictitious Hudson City, New Jersey
- Class of Nuke 'Em High (1986)
- Clean and Sober (1988) - stars Michael Keaton and Kathy Baker; directed by Ron Howard; partially filmed in Gloucester City
- Clerks (1994)
- Clerks II (2006)
- The Cohens and the Kellys in Atlantic City (1929)
- The Color of Money (1986)
- Coneheads (1993)
- Confessions of a Teenage Drama Queen (2004)
- Convention City (1933)
- Convention Girl (1935)
- The Cookout (2004)
- Cop Land (1997)
- Cosmopolitan (2003)
- Coyote Ugly (2000) - was given the name "Jersey" because she was originally from South Amboy
- The Crew (2000)
- Da Hip Hop Witch (2000)
- Dan in Real Life (2007)
- The Dark Knight (2008)
- The Dark Knight Rises (2012) - filmed at Military Park station in Newark
- Dark Ride (2006) - took place in Asbury Park
- The Day the Earth Stood Still (2008)
- The Dead Zone (1983) - opening scene presents the Captain Samuel Sharp House, Mauricetown
- Delivering Milo (2001)
- Desperately Seeking Susan (1985)
- Dogma (1999)
- Donnie Brasco (1997) - Clifton
- Down the Shore (2011)
- Duane Hopwood (2005)
- Eddie and the Cruisers (1983)
- Eddie and the Cruisers II: Eddie Lives! (1989)
- Elizabethtown
- Empire Records (1995)
- Escape from New York (1981) - opening scene is supposed to be Bayonne
- Fallen (1998) - Mullica Twp.
- The Family Man (2000)
- The Family Stone (2005) - Madison
- Fatal Desire (2006)
- Feel the Beat (2020)
- The Fighter (2010)
- Firstborn (1984)
- Flight 93 (2006)
- Forget About It (2006) - primarily filmed in Hoboken
- Frame of Mind (2009) - Carlstadt
- Frankenhooker (1990)
- Freedomland (2006)
- The Freshman (1990) - ending of movie is supposed to take place in Cherry Hill
- Friday the 13th (1980) - set in fictional Crystal Lake Camp, NJ; filmed in Hardwick, at No-Be-Bo-Sco camp
- Friday the 13th (2009)
- Funny Money (2006)
- Funny Pages (2022)
- Garden State (2004)
- Girl Most Likely (2012)
- The Godfather: Part III (1990)
- Gone Fishin' (1997)
- Goodbye, Columbus (1969)
- Gracie (2007)
- Greetings from the Shore (2007) - based and shot in Lavallette
- Guess Who (2005)
- Gunshy (1998)
- Gypsy 83 (2004)
- Happiness (1998) - "You know, people are always putting New Jersey down. None of my friends can believe I live here. But that's because they don't get it: I'm living in a state of irony."
- Harold & Kumar Go to White Castle (2004)
- Hellboy (2004)
- Homeboy (1988)
- Hudson Hawk (1991)
- The Hurricane (1999)
- Hysterical Blindness (2002) - takes place in Bayonne
- The Iceman (2012)
- Imaginary Heroes (2004)
- Imitation of Life (1934)
- I.Q. (1994)
- In & Out (1997) - Clinton, Montclair, Pompton Lakes, and other North Jersey locations
- The In-Laws (1979)
- Jaws - takes place in the small New England beach resort of Amity Island, but was based on the true story of a great white shark which terrorized the shores of New Jersey in the summer of 1916
- Jay and Silent Bob Strike Back (2001)
- Jersey Boys (2014)
- Jersey Girl (1992) - starring Jami Gertz and Dylan McDermott
- Jersey Girl (2004) - directed by Kevin Smith, starring Ben Affleck
- Jersey Shore Shark Attack (2012)
- The Jimmy Show (2002)
- Joe the King (1999)
- John Wick (2014)
- Joker (2019)
- Julie & Julia (2009) - Hoboken
- Just Friends (2005)
- Just The Ticket (1999) - Roselle Park
- The Kill-Off (1990)
- The King of Marvin Gardens (1972)
- Lansdown (2002)
- The Last Broadcast (1998)
- The Last Detail (1973) - Meadows's Mom lives in Camden
- The Last Time (2007)
- Lean on Me (1989) Paterson
- The Lemon Sisters (1990)
- Lianna (1983)
- Little Black Book (2004)
- Live Free or Die Hard (2007)
- Lock Up (1989)
- Loins of Punjab Presents (2007)
- The Long Kiss Goodnight (1996) - "Easy, sport. Got myself out of Beirut once, I think I can get out of New Jersey." "Yeah, well don't be so sure. Others have tried and failed. The entire population, in fact."
- Mafioso (1962) - North Bergen
- Mallrats (1995)
- The Many Saints of Newark (2021)
- Men in Black (1997)
- Morning Glory (2010)
- Mortal Thoughts (1991)
- Moving (1988)
- Música (2024)
- The Nanny Diaries - Annie is a graduate of Montclair University
- National Treasure (2004)
- New Jersey Drive (1995)
- New Jersey: The Movie (2009)
- Nick and Norah's Infinite Playlist (2008)
- North (1994)
- Not Fade Away (2012)
- Nothing But Trouble (1991)
- Now You Know (2002)
- Ocean's Eleven (2001) - Danny Ocean is released from a prison in New Jersey
- Old Dogs (2009) - partially filmed in Hoboken (Dan's apartment)
- On The Waterfront (1954) - filmed and set in Hoboken
- One for the Money (2012)
- Owning Mahowny (2003)
- Palookaville (1995)
- Paper Soldiers (2002)
- Paterson (2016)
- Paul Blart: Mall Cop (2009)
- The Perfect Holiday (2007) - set in Jersey Gardens Mall
- The Pick-up Artist (1987) - set in Atlantic City
- Picture Perfect (1997) - Hoboken and West Orange
- Pootie Tang (2001) - Old Bridge
- The Prowler (1981) - filmed in Cape May, New Jersey, though set in "Avalon", California; Seaville United Methodist Church and Southern Mansion Bed & Breakfast feature
- The Purple Rose of Cairo (1985)
- Ragtime (1981) - Spring Lake; James Cagney's last film
- Raising Helen (2004)
- Ransom (1996) - filmed throughout Bergen County
- The Rebel Set (1959)
- Restaurant (1998)
- Red River (1998)
- Riding in Cars with Boys (2001) - East Orange (Upsala College)
- Rocket Science (2007) - set in Plainsboro
- Rounders (1998)
- Running on Empty (1988)
- Running Scared (2006)
- Satan's Playground (2005) - shot in Whitesbog in Burlington County
- School of Rock (2003)
- Second Best (2004)
- The Secret Life of Walter Mitty (1947) - set in Perth Amboy
- She-Devil (1989 film) - set in Long Island but the house explosion scene was filmed in Union
- Sherrybaby (2006)
- The Simian Line (2000)
- Snake Eyes (1998)
- Something Wild (1986)
- The Soprano State (2010)
- Spider-Man 3 (2007)
- Spider-Man: Far From Home (2019) - Towards the end of the movie, Peter Parker and his classmates land in Newark, NJ.
- Stardust Memories (1980) - filmed in Asbury Park, Belmar, Deal, Hoboken, Neptune City, Ocean Grove
- The Station Agent (2003)
- Stealing Home (1988)
- Storytelling (2001)
- Street Fight (2005)
- Superman (1978)
- Swimfan (2002)
- This Thing of Ours (2003)
- The Toxic Avenger (1984) and three sequels - "the first superhero from New Jersey"
- Trade (2007)
- Transformers: Revenge of the Fallen (2009) - Sam Witwicky (Shia LaBeouf) attends Princeton University
- Union City (1980)
- United 93 (2006) - flight departs from Newark International Airport
- Vision Quest (1985) - actually set in Spokane, WA, but the female lead says she's from Trenton
- Voices (1979) - mostly filmed in Hoboken; Amy Irving, Michael Ontkean
- Walking to the Waterline (1998)
- War of the Worlds (2005) - one of four states where it was filmed; New Jersey locations included sites in Bayonne, Newark, and Howell Township in Monmouth County
- The Wedding Singer (1998)
- Welcome to the Dollhouse (1995)
- Wild Hearts Can't Be Broken (1991)
- Win Win (2011)
- Winter Solstice (2004)
- Wise Guys (1986)
- The World According to Garp - scenes filmed in Denville movie theater and Madison City Hall
- World Trade Center (2006) - Clifton
- Ye Maaya Chesave (2010) - Princeton University at Princeton
- Zoolander - partially filmed in Ogdensburg

== See also ==
- Television and film in New Jersey
- List of television shows set in New Jersey
- List of movies based on location
- List of people from New Jersey
- Thomas Edison
- Kevin Smith
- New Jersey films
