= List of films set in Myanmar =

Apart from the many Burmese movies which were filmed locally by Burmese directors and producers, several foreign movies have also been, at least partly, set in Burma. Only very few of them were actually shot on the scene, and most are set in Burma during World War II.

== Foreign movies set in Burma ==
- A Maid of Mandalay (1913) - short movie based on Rudyard Kipling’s famous ballad ‘Mandalay’, filmed on location and starring Maurice Costello and Clara Kimball-Young
- The Road to Mandalay (1926)
- Mandalay (1934) – The Irrawaddy River is portrayed by the Sacramento Delta in California
- The Girl from Mandalay (1936)
- Burma Convoy (1941)
- Moon over Burma (1940) – Starring Dorothy Lamour, depicts Burma as a "jungle paradise"
- A Yank on the Burma Road (1942) – Primarily set on the China end of the Burma Road
- Bombs over Burma (1942)
- Rookies in Burma (1943) – As of 2004, the only Hollywood Burma comedy
- Burma Rani (Queen of Burma) (1945) - Indian WWII spy film by T. R. Sundaram, set during the Burma Campaign and starring K. L. V. Vasantha in the lead role of the female spy
- Burma Victory (1945) - British film
- En Magan (1945) - Indian WWII film by R. S. Mani, set during the Burma Campaign and based on the play Waterloo Bridge by Robert E. Sherwood
- Objective Burma (1945) – Directed by Raoul Walsh and starring Errol Flynn, opens with documentary footage
- Francis, a.k.a. Francis the Talking Mule (1950) - majority of the film is told in flashback describing the main character's involvement in the CBI Theater
- The Purple Plain (1954) – Based on a novel by H.E. Bates; was actually filmed in Ceylon, now Sri Lanka
- Escape to Burma (1955)
- The Burmese Harp, a.k.a. Harp of Burma (1956) - Japanese movie directed by Kon Ichikawa, nominated for an Oscar in the Best Foreign Language Film category
- The Bridge on the River Kwai (1957) - British-American epic war film based on the building of the Burma Railway
- Never So Few (1959) - with Frank Sinatra, Peter Lawford, Steve McQueen, Charles Bronson and Gina Lollobrigida
- Yesterday's Enemy (1959) - British movie set in Burma during World War II
- Merrill’s Marauders (1962) - set on the Burma Road during World War II, and actually filmed on the Philippines
- Rangoon Rowdy (1979) - Indian film starring Krishnam Raju and Jaya Prada
- Beyond Rangoon (1995) - depicts events during the 8888 Uprising in 1988. Starring Patricia Arquette
- The Legend of Suriyothai (2001)
- Pudhukottaiyilirundhu Saravanan (2004) - Indian romantic adventure film by S. S. Stanley, set in Myanmar
- Stealth (2005) - science-fiction action film starring Josh Lucas, Jessica Biel, Jamie Foxx and Sam Shepard. One scene involves the aircraft bombing of a building in Rangoon
- King Naresuan (2007)
- Rambo (2008) - starring Sylvester Stallone
- Burma VJ (2009) - documentary by Anders Ostergaard
- Largo Winch II (2011) - starring Tomer Sisley and Sharon Stone
- The Lady (2011) - biopic about Aung San Suu Kyi directed by Luc Besson, starring Michelle Yeoh as Aung San Suu Kyi and David Thewlis as her husband
- Anegan (2015) - Indian period romance film by K. V. Anand about Indians in Burma
- Born Warriors (2016) - documentary shot throughout Burma over two decades focusing on the indigenous fighting sport of Lethwei by Vincent Giordano
- Golden Kingdom (2016) - a narrative feature film about four orphan boys, novice monks living in a Buddhist monastery in a remote part of Northeast Burma
- Operation Mekong(2016)
- Rangoon (2017) - Indian war film by Vishal Bhardwaj, set during the Burma Campaign in Rangoon
- Rangoon (2017) - Indian crime-action film by Rajkumar Periasamy, about the Expulsion of Indians from Burma (including from Rangoon)
- Line Walker 2: Invisible Spy (2019)
- Presence (2021) – Documentary directed by Richard Swarbrick, including recreations

== See also ==
- Lists of films by location
