= List of television shows set in New Jersey =

This page provides a partial list of television shows set in the State of New Jersey.

== Live format ==
- Brick City
- Comic Book Men
- Jersey Shore
- Jerseylicious
- Miss America Pageant (1954–2005), held in Atlantic City starting in 1921, first televised in 1954, moved to Las Vegas in 2006
- MTV's Shore Thing (2002), live programming originated from the Seaside Heights Boardwalk and beach
- MTV's Summer Share (1998), live programming originated from the Seaside Heights Boardwalk and beach
- The Real Housewives of New Jersey
- The Richard Bey Show (1987–1996), also known as People are Talking and 9 Broadcast Plaza; originated from Secaucus

== Comedy, drama, and reality ==
- 12 Monkeys (2015–2018), largely set in Raritan, New Jersey
- Akkara Kazhchakal, popular Malayalam sitcom series
- The Apprentice (2004–2015), frequent tasks at Trump Organization properties in New Jersey
- Aqua Teen Hunger Force (series run: 2000–2015; years set in New Jersey: 2000-2010), near the southern Jersey Shore
- Batman: The Animated Series (1992–1995), set in Gotham City, a fictional city of New Jersey
- Boardwalk Empire (2010–2014), drama set in Atlantic City during the Prohibition Era
- Bob’s Burgers (2011–), animated sitcom set in the fictional town of Seymour’s Bay, New Jersey
- Cake Boss (2009–2020), reality show set at Carlo's Bake Shop in Hoboken
- Charles in Charge (1984–1990), near the fictional Copeland College in New Brunswick
- Down the Shore (1992–1993), Belmar, New Jersey on the Jersey Shore
- Electric Bloom (2025–) takes place in Edison, New Jersey
- Futurama (1999–2003, 2008–2013, 2023–), Robot Hell takes place in Atlantic City
- Glam Fairy follows Jerseylicious star Alexa Prisco and her team of hair and makeup artists, also known as her "fairies" at the Glam Factory in Hoboken, New Jersey
- House (2004–2012), fictional Princeton-Plainsboro Teaching Hospital (presumably in Plainsboro)
- Hudson Street (1995–1996), sitcom starring Tony Danza and Lori Loughlin, took place at a fictional newspaper in Hoboken
- Jersey Couture (2010–2012), features Diane & Co., a dress shop in Freehold, NJ
- Jersey Shore (2009-2012), follows the lives of eight soon-to-be roommates living and working together for the summer in Seaside Heights, New Jersey
- Jerseylicious (2010), reality show set at the Gatsby Salon in Green Brook
- Jonas (2009–2010), starring The Jonas Brothers, who originate in New Jersey
- Makin' It (1979), set in Passaic, New Jersey
- Megas XLR (2004–2005), set in Jersey City
- Method & Red (2004), unspecified New Jersey suburb (presumably near New York City)
- Ms. Marvel (2022), starring Iman Vellani as Kamala Khan, a 16-year-old Pakistani-American high school student from Jersey City obsessed with the super hero Captain Marvel
- Nikita (2010–2013), set in and around New Jersey and the primary fictional setting of the show is set in underground New Jersey
- Point Pleasant (2005), Supernatural drama set in Point Pleasant
- Ramy (2019–2022), set in New Jersey
- The Sopranos (1999–2007), various parts of Essex County and other counties in New Jersey (with occasional scenes in Manhattan and Brooklyn)
- Stand by Your Man (1992), set in "Franklin Heights"
- That's Life (2000–2002), fictitious "Bellefield" (ostensibly Belleville or Bloomfield)
- Venture Brothers mighty monarchs mansion in Newark, New Jersey
- WandaVision (2021), set in the fictitious town of Westview, New Jersey
- Yellowjackets (2021–present)

== Game shows ==
- Trump Card (1990–1991), filmed at Trump Castle (Now The Golden Nugget) in Atlantic City

== News ==
- CNBC – most of its in-studio programming originates from Fort Lee
- MSNBC – most of its in-studio programming originates from Secaucus
- New Jersey Network – most of its in-studio programming originates from Trenton or Newark
- News 12 New Jersey – central studio-office complex in Edison; with remote newsrooms in Newark, Trenton, Madison, Oakland and Wall Township

== See also ==
- Television and film in New Jersey
- List of television shows set in New Jersey
- List of movies based on location
- List of people from New Jersey
- Thomas Edison
- Kevin Smith
