= List of films set in Tampa =

The following is a list of films set in Tampa, Florida and surrounding areas:

- Anna in the Tropics (2002)
- Aquamarine (2006)
- Black Like Me (1964)
- China Moon (1994)
- Cocoon (1985)
- Cop and a Half (1993)
- Coupe de Ville
- Dolphin Tale (2011)
- Dolphin Tale 2 (2014)
- Edward Scissorhands (1990)
- Follow That Dream (1962)
- A Fonder Heart (2011)
- A Guy Named Joe (1943)
- Fear of Rain (2021)
- Goodfellas (1990)
- Grace Is Gone (2007)
- Great Expectations (1998)
- The Infiltrator (2016)
- Live by Night (2016)
- Magic Mike (2012)
- Miss Peregrine's Home for Peculiar Children (2016)
- Parker (2013)
- The Parent Trap II (1986)
- The Punisher (2004)
- Second Noah
- Sex Ed
- Spring Breakers (2012)
- Strategic Air Command (1955)
- Summer Rental (1985)
- Thunder in Paradise (1994)
- Zola (2020)

== See also ==
- International Arts and Film Foundation
- List of movies based on location
