= List of films set in Hawaii =

The following is a list of films set in Hawaii by release year.

== Notable films ==
- Lilo & Stitch (2025)
- Everything, Everything (2017)
- Snowden (2016)
- Aloha (2015)
- Big Eyes (2014)
- Godzilla (2014) (destroyed by a giant monster)
- Das Paradies in uns (2013)
- The Haumana (2013)
- Battleship (2012)
- The Descendants (2011)
- Just Go With It (2011)
- Soul Surfer (2011)
- Dinocroc vs. Supergator (2010)
- Mega Shark Versus Crocosaurus (2010)
- 2012 (2009) (destroyed by a super volcano)
- A Perfect Getaway (2009)
- Princess Kaʻiulani (2009)
- Forgetting Sarah Marshall (2008)
- Johnny Kapahala: Back on Board (2007)
- 10.5 Apocalypse (2006) (destroyed by a tsunami)
- Snakes on a Plane (2006)
- Aloha, Scooby-Doo! (2005)
- 50 First Dates (2004)
- The Big Bounce (2004)
- The Ride (2003)
- Blue Crush (2002)
- Lilo & Stitch (2002)
- Punch-Drunk Love (2002)
- Monsters, Inc. (2001)
- Pearl Harbor (2001)
- To End All Wars (2001)
- Rip Girls (2000)
- Johnny Tsunami (1999)
- Beyond Paradise (1998)
- Lani Loa - The Passage (1998)
- Six Days Seven Nights (1998)
- A Very Brady Sequel (1996)
- Picture Bride (1995)
- Honeymoon in Vegas (1992)
- Black Widow (1987)
- North Shore (1987)
- Hard Ticket to Hawaii (1987)
- Blood & Orchids (1986)
- The Hawaiians (film) (1970)
- Tora! Tora! Tora! (1970)
- Kona Coast (1968)
- Hawaii (1966)
- Paradise, Hawaiian Style (1966)
- In Harm's Way (1965)
- Diamond Head (1963)
- Girls! Girls! Girls! (1962)
- Blue Hawaii (1961)
- Gidget Goes Hawaiian (1961)
- The Revolt of Mamie Stover (1956)
- Hell's Half Acre (1954)
- From Here to Eternity (1953)
- Charlie Chan in Honolulu (1938)
- Waikiki Wedding (1937)
- The Black Camel (film) (1931)

== See also ==
- List of films based on location
- Hawaii in popular culture
