= Rangoon Rowdy =

- Directed by: Dasari Narayana Rao
- Music by: Raghavulu J.V.
- Release date: 1979
- Running time: 103 minutes
- Country: India
- Language: Telugu

Rangoon Rowdy is a 1979 Telugu drama film directed by Dasari Narayana Rao and produced by Vadde Sobhanadri under Vijaya Madhavi Pictures. The film was presented by Vadde Kishore. The film stars Mahanati Savitri, Krishnam Raju, Jaya Prada, Mohan Babu and Deepa in the lead roles. The music was composed by J. V. Raghavulu. The song "o jabilee" is taken from the Hindi movie Muqaddar ka sikandar ". It is Krishnam Raju's 100th film. It is the first Indian film to be shot in Burma.

== Cast ==
- Krishnam Raju as Raju
- Jaya Prada as Indu / Rajani
- Mohan Babu as Babu
- Deepa as Deepa
- Savitri as Deepa's mother
- Sowcar Janaki as Janaki
- Rao Gopal Rao as Gopal Rao
- Prabhakar Reddy as Dharma Raju
- Gokina Rama Rao as Rama Rao
- Raavi Kondala Rao as Panthulu
- Dhulipala as lawyer
- Mukkamala as Judge
- K. V. Chalam as Raju's friend
- Ceylon Manohar as Smuggler
- Nalinikanth as Gopal Rao's son.
- Master Nagoor (Mano) as young Raju
- Tulasi
