= List of films and TV series set in Santa Catalina Island, California =

This is a list of films and TV series set in Santa Catalina Island, California, United States. It covers topical settings and storyline subjects set in or around Santa Catalina Island. Included are individual episodes of TV series.

== Films ==
=== 1910s ===
- Feeding Seals at Catalina Isle - 1910 educational short film made on the beach, likely by producer Broncho Billy Anderson who was said to be heading there with his Essanay crew to film in 1909.
- Santa Catalina, Magic Isle of the Pacific - 1911 American Film Manufacturing Company short
- Man's Genesis - 1912 film by director D. W. Griffith, one of the first films made on Catalina Island
- The Valley of the Moon - 1914 silent film, directed by Hobart Bosworth from a story by Jack London
- To Have and to Hold - 1916 silent film, starring Mae Murray and Wallace Reid.
- A Prizma Color Visit to Catalina - 1919 film in Prizma Color.
- Camping Out - 1919 short with Roscoe Arbuckle, Al St. John, Alice Lake, and Monty Banks.

=== 1920s ===
- Leap Year - 1921 silent film, starring Roscoe Arbuckle, co-directed by James Cruze, partially filmed on Catalina Island
- Beyond the Rocks - 1922 silent film, starring Rudolph Valentino and Gloria Swanson.
- The Primitive Lover - 1922 silent film, starring Constance Talmadge.
- The Dangerous Maid - 1923 silent film, starring Constance Talmadge, partially filmed in Catalina interior.
- The Isle of Lost Ships - 1923 silent film, starring Anna Q. Nilsson, directed by Maurice Tourneur
- Captain Blood - 1924 silent film, starring J. Warren Kerrigan and Jean Paige, with Catalina substituting for Barbados.
- Feet of Clay - 1924 silent film, starring Rod La Rocque and Vera Reynolds, directed by Cecil B DeMille
- The Navigator - 1924 silent comedy film, directed by and starring Buster Keaton, filmed over a 10-week period in Avalon Bay on Catalina Island
- The Sea Hawk - 1924 silent film, directed by Frank Lloyd
- Women Who Give - 1924 silent film, directed by Reginald Barker, with the island coastline impersonating Cape Cod
- Half a Man (film) - 1925 silent film, starring Stan Laurel
- Never the Twain Shall Meet - 1925 silent film, directed by Maurice Tourneur, with pickup sequences on the island after the production returned from Tahiti
- The Trouble with Wives - 1925 silent film, starring Florence Vidor, and Esther Ralston, for beach sequence
- Old Ironsides - 1926 silent film, directed by James Cruze, the island posing as the shores of Tripoli
- The King of Kings - 1927 silent film, directed by Cecil B. DeMille
- Sadie Thompson - 1928 silent film, directed by Raoul Walsh and starring Gloria Swanson with Catalina filling in for Pago Pago
- Condemned - 1929 film, starring Ronald Colman and Ann Harding released with both talkie and silent versions.
- Scarlet Seas - 1929 film, starring Richard Barthelmess and Betty Compson
- The Single Standard - 1929 film, starring Greta Garbo

=== 1930s ===
- My Past - 1931; starring Bebe Daniels
- Island of Lost Souls - 1932; Charles Laughton, Bela Lugosi
- Rain - 1932 film
- The Narrow Corner - 1933 film; starring Douglas Fairbanks Jr and Patricia Ellis
- Treasure Island - 1934 film
- Mutiny on the Bounty - 1935; Charles Laughton, Clark Gable
- I Live My Life - 1935 film, starring Joan Crawford
- Murder on a Honeymoon - 1935 film, starring Edna May Oliver as Hildegarde Withers, takes place on Catalina Island
- Pirate Party on Catalina Isle - 1935 short film; features a pirate-themed variety show set on the island
- Captain Blood - 1935 film
- Captain Calamity - 1936
- Captains Courageous - 1937 film
- You're Only Young Once - 1937; Andy Hardy family vacation movie, starring Mickey Rooney
- Blockade - 1938 film starring Henry Fonda and Madeleine Carroll
- Isle of Destiny - 1939
- You Said a Mouthful, 1932, comedy. A shipping clerk is mistaken for a swimming champion who is expected to participate in a long-distance swim competition off Catalina Island. Director: Lloyd Bacon. Starring: Joe E. Brown, Ginger Rogers, Preston Foster.

=== 1940s ===
- Typhoon - 1940 film; starring Dorothy Lamour and Robert Preston
- Ruthless - 1948 film; starring Zachary Scott, Sydney Greenstreet and Louis Hayward, with scenes filmed at Toyon Bay

=== 1950s ===
- All Ashore - 1953 film; Mickey Rooney and Dick Haymes
- Dangerous Charter - shot in 1958 but released in 1962, designed to show off the Panavision process
- Battle of the Coral Sea - 1959 film.

=== 1960s ===
- Platinum High School - 1960 film; Mickey Rooney and Terry Moore.
- Jack the Giant Killer (1962 film) - Noted as the 500th movie in 30 years filmed at Santa Catalina Island
- Much of the 1964 film Raiders from Beneath the Sea was set in and around Avalon.
- Several scenes in the 1966 romantic comedy film The Glass Bottom Boat, starring Doris Day and Rod Taylor, were filmed in and around Avalon and Avalon Harbor on Catalina Island.
- The 1967 teen comedy film Catalina Caper, starring Tommy Kirk, was filmed on Santa Catalina Island. This movie was later featured in episode 204 of Mystery Science Theater 3000.
- Some of Summer Children (1965), a neo-noir film directed by James Bruner, was filmed in Avalon.

=== 1970s ===
- The Night of the Squid (16 January 1970), a documentary by Jacques Cousteau, was filmed in front of the Casino.
- In Bless the Beasts and Children (1971); starring Bill Mumy, parts were filmed east of the Isthmus, including Catalina's "buffalos" (bison) and some locals.
- Several scenes from the 1974 film Chinatown, starring Jack Nicholson and Faye Dunaway, were filmed on Catalina, including one showing the Casino.
- Jaws, 1975. Roy Scheider, Robert Shaw and Richard Dreyfuss. Parts of the movie were filmed at Catalina, but mostly in Martha's Vineyard.

=== 1990s ===
- The 1994 film Sherlock: Undercover Dog was both set and filmed on the island.
- The closing sequence of the 1997 film Suicide Kings, starring Christopher Walken, Denis Leary, Sean Patrick Flanery, Johnny Galecki, Jay Mohr, Jeremy Sisto, and Henry Thomas is a sequence of aerial shots from various parts of Catalina Island. A long flying pan out the western harbor of the Two Harbors isthmus starts the sequence.
- Portions of the 1998 film Billy's Hollywood Screen Kiss, starring Sean Hayes and Brad Rowe, utilize the Catalina ferry terminal in San Pedro, California as well as locations on Catalina Island, including Avalon Harbor and the Casino building. The film closes with the song "Love Slave of Catalina".

=== 2000s ===
- The 2003 movie Aquanoids was filmed almost exclusively on the island. In the movie, Avalon was referred to as "Babylon Bay" and the island as "Santa Clara."
- Hollywood's Magical Island: Catalina, 2023, documentary film of the island with archival footage and interviews.
- The 2006 TV comedy Falling in Love with the Girl Next Door, featuring Crystal Allen, Ken Marino and Patrick Duffy, takes place on Catalina Island.
- The ending to the 2008 film Step Brothers is supposed to be a wine mixer on the island of Catalina but was actually filmed at the Trump National Golf Course.
- Dead in the Head, 2010. Action, adventure, comedy movie starring Estephania LeBaron, Brad Milne, William D. Caldwell. Two bounty hunters go to Catalina Island to arrest a bail jumper and find what they believe to be zombies.

== Radio and Television ==
=== 1960s ===
- A 1962 episode of Route 66 called "There I Am - There I Always Am" starring Martin Milner, George Maharis and Joanna Moore was filmed at various locations on Catalina, including Avalon and Little Harbor. Filming took place between March 26 and April 1, 1962.

=== 1970s ===
- A 1970 music video for Jack Wild's song "Some Beautiful", was filmed on Santa Catalina, showing Wild riding a bike through various parts of Avalon Harbor as well as parts of Avalon.
- A 1972 episode of Cannon called "The Island Caper", starring William Conrad, Keenan Wynn, was filmed on Catalina, showing various parts of Avalon including the Casino.
- A 1975 episode of Mannix called "Bird of Prey", starring Mike Connors was filmed on Catalina, showing various parts of Avalon including inside the Casino.
- A 1976 episode of Quincy, M.E. called "Hot Ice, Cold Hearts", starring Jack Klugman, Robert Alda and Lynnette Mettey, was filmed on Catalina, showing various parts of the Avalon Harbor and parts of Avalon.
- Catalina was one of the settings for the 1977 CBS TV series Code R.
- Several scenes from an episode of the TV series Emergency! were filmed on Catalina Island

=== 1980s ===
- In 1984, Catalina and the Avalon Casino were the filming locations for the Airwolf episode titled "Sins of the Past", though the island was given a fictional name.
- In 1989, actor Chad Allen is seen visiting Santa Catalina Island in the promotional video The Real Chad Allen. Allen is seen visiting Avalon there and also snorkeling off the coast in the vicinity of a sunken ship.

=== 1990s ===
- In 1993, the daytime soap opera The Bold and the Beautiful filmed on Catalina for several episodes, most notably at The Inn on Mount Ada.
- A 3-part episode during Season Six of the TV series Growing Pains where the story was set in Europe, was filmed on the island. In at least one episode, the Casino can be seen in the distance.
- Baywatch, "Island of Romance," season 3, episode 13, original air date Monday January 11, 1993. CJ (Pamela Anderson) and Stephanie (Alexandra Paul) travel to Catalina Island for a women-only weekend where they encounter various misadventures and characters.
- Baywatch, "To Everything There Is a Season," season 6, episode 5, original airdate October 28, 1995. Cody (David Chokachi) agrees to swim to Catalina with Stephanie (Alexandra Paul) as part of his Olympic training and they rescue two boatloads of drunken college students.
- Baywatch, "Leap of Faith," season 6, episode 6, original air date November 4, 1995. Stephanie (Alexandra Paul), CJ (Pamela Anderson), and Caroline (Yasmine Bleeth) head to Catalina on a girls only junior lifeguard trip to and two of the girls get trapped in a flooded cave.
- Baywatch, "Heal the Bay," season 7, episode 11, original airdate January 27, 1997. Mitch (David Hasselhoff) becomes ill after swimming over drums of toxic chemicals dumped illegally off Catalina.
- Baywatch, "The Big Blue," season 9, episode 12, original airdate January 16, 1999. Jessie (Brooke Burns) persuades Mitch (David Hasselhoff) to go skydiving, but plans change when they need to rescue people from a boat wreck off Catalina.

=== 2000s ===
- In 2002, the TV show Endurance was filmed on Parson's Beach, near the west end of the island.
- In an episode from the first season of the Fox series Arrested Development titled "Staff Infection", employees of the Bluth Company get lost on Catalina Island, and are found and transported by a sheep herder in his animal trailer.
- In the MTV reality series Daddy's Girls, Angela and Vanessa decide to spy on their friend, Alycia. As payback for them spying, their cousin Jessica lies and tells them that Alycia went to Catalina, leading Angela and Vanessa to spend hours searching the island.
- UFO Hunters, "USOs," season 1, episode 2, original air date February 6, 2008. On January 26, 1980 a USO (Unidentified Submerged Object) shot beams of light at a plane. It seemed to cause equipment malfunction and the plane to crash in the water near Catalina Island.

=== 2010s ===
- The pilot episode of action series SAF3 takes place on the island.
- Episode 2 of Season 2 of Fear The Walking Dead, "We All Fall Down", takes place on Catalina.
- The series finale of Love, "Catalina", takes place on the island.
- Ocean Mysteries with Jeff Corwin, "Santa Catalina," season 4, episode 12, original air date January 31, 2015. Jeff travels to Santa Catalina Island, dives through kelp forests and encounters both California sea lions and critically endangered Catalina Island foxes.
- Rock the Park, "Santa Catalina Island," season 4, episode 4, original air date May 19, 2018. Colton and Jack explore this island by bike, search for the free-roaming American bison and attempt their first solo shore dive.
- Twentysixmiles (working title: Catalina Island) 6 episodes, released 2010. Jack Kincaid's (John Schneider) wife Keri Kincaid (Jessica Tuck) files for divorce and moves from Los Angeles to Catalina Island.
- Made, "Catalina Island (Entrepreneurs)," season 12, episode 21, Reality TV, Original air date April 4, 2013. Four childhood friends reunite on Catalina Island to start a matchmaking business.

=== 2020s ===
- Islands Without Cars with Kira Hesser, "California's Santa Catalina Island," season 3, episode 2, original air date October 5, 2020. Santa Catalina Island is warm breezes, Hollywood-style romance, and high-seas adventure.
- Close Enough, "Where the Buffalo Roam", season 3, episode 1, original air date April 7, 2022. Emily and Josh go on a delayed honeymoon to Catalina Island and are attacked by bison.
- Ghost Adventures, "Curse of Catalina Island," season 23, episode 9, original air date November 17, 2022. The Ghost Adventures crew goes to Catalina Island it investigate paranormal activity at a theater that held the disinterred bones of the island's indigenous people.
- Tough as Nails, "Welcome to Catalina Island," season 4, episode 1, original air date January 4, 2023. Twelve contestants must replace old boat moorings on Catalina Island. The first two who complete the challenge get to select their teammates.
- Royal Crackers, "Catalina" season 2, episode 2, original air date March 7, 2024. Theo and Stebe track the origin of Stebe's troubling nightmares to Catalina Island.

== See also ==
- List of films set in Los Angeles
- List of television shows set in Los Angeles
- List of years in film
- List of years in television
