= List of films about Iran =

This is a list of films that involve Iran. (This listing excludes Iranian films).

== List ==
Title	Year	Comments
Not Without My Daughter	1991	Betty Mahmoody's biography, portrays post-revolutionary Iran
Persepolis	2007	Animated production based on two graphic novels by Marjane Satrapi's biography, portrays Iranian revolution
The stoning of Soraia M.	2008	about stoning in Iran
Cul-de-sac	2010	Kiana Firouz's biography, about homosexuality in Iran
Circumstance	2011	about homosexuality in Iran
Argo	2012	about Iran hostage crisis
Rhino Season	2012	about Iranian Revolution
Rosewater	2014	Maziar Bahari's biography, portrays 2009 protests
Red Rose	2014	about 2009 protests
Desert Dancer	2014	Afshin Ghaffarian's biography, portrays 2009 protests
Appropriate Behavior	2014	portrays immigrants in the United States
Septembers of Shiraz	2015	about a Jewish-Iranian family forced to flee the country in the aftermath of the Iranian Revolution
Under the Shadow	2016	about War of the Cities
The Persian Version	2023	about an Iranian family (first- and second-generation) in the United States
