= List of films set in Houston =

These movies/shows were filmed in Houston, Texas

- The Houston Story (1956) - starring Gene Barry and Barbara Hale (of Perry Mason)
- Hellfighters (1968) - with John Wayne
- Brewster McCloud (1970) – first film to be filmed inside the Astrodome
- The Thief Who Came to Dinner (1973) – set and filmed in Houston
- Sugar Hill (1974) - set and filmed in Houston
- The Sugarland Express (1974 film) - partially filmed and set in Houston suburb Sugar Land
- Rollerball (1975) – set in Houston but filmed in Bavaria, Germany
- Futureworld (1976) – filmed at the Johnson Space Center facilities and Jones Hall
- Logan's Run (1976) – filmed inside the Houston Hyatt Regency
- The Bad News Bears in Breaking Training (1977) - filmed in the Astrodome as well as Bayland Park on 6400 Bissonnet
- Murder at the World Series (1977) – made-for-TV film
- FM (1978) – filmed at Greenway Plaza in Houston
- The Swarm (1978) - second unit scenes filmed on Memorial Drive, Astrodome, Interstate 45 South/McKinney Street Exit ramp, and the main lobby of 2 Houston Center
- Texas (1980–1982) – daytime soap opera, a spin-off of Another World
- Urban Cowboy (1980) - Filmed at the old Gilley's in Pasadena, Texas.
- Murder in Texas (1981) – made-for-TV film
- Student Bodies (1981)
- Terms of Endearment (1982)
- Airplane II: The Sequel (1982)
- Adam (1983) - set in Hollywood, Florida, filmed in and around Houston. Based on the 1981 disappearance and murder of Adam Walsh.
- Local Hero (1983) - filmed in Houston and Scotland
- The Man Who Loved Women (1983 film) - Blake Edwards movie filmed in Houston.
- Uncommon Valor (1983) – set in Houston, filmed in California
- Blood Simple (1984)
- Cutter to Houston (1984)
- Paris, Texas (1984) – shot in several cities around Texas, including Houston
- The Trip to Bountiful (1984) – set in Houston but filmed in Dallas
- Pray for Death (1985) - set and filmed in Houston
- The Outing (1987) - set and filmed in Houston and Galveston
- Buck James (1987–1988) – based on Dr. Red Duke
- Houston Knights (1987–1988)
- My Best Friend Is a Vampire (1988)
- Twins (1988) – sale of engine set in Houston
- A Tiger's Tale (1988) – Rose's house was in League City
- Full Moon in Blue Water (1988) – Filmed in Seabrook
- Blind Fury (1989) – filmed partially in Houston
- Cohen and Tate (1989) - Highway portion filmed along Memorial Drive near Allen Parkway
- For All Mankind (1989) – documentary filmed partially in Houston
- Leningrad Cowboys Go America (1989)
- Akkare Akkare Akkare (1990) – Malayalam movie filmed in Houston
- I Come in Peace (1990)
- RoboCop 2 (1990) - set in Detroit, but chiefly filmed in Houston
- Rush (1991) – filmed in Houston as well as at The Swinging Door BBQ in Richmond, Texas.
- City of Joy (1992) – first scene is set in Houston
- Sidekicks (1992)
- A Taste for Killing (1992) – made-for-TV film
- Wild Wheels (1992) - documentary footage dating back to the late 1980s during the Houston Art Car Parade including artist interviews are seen in the film - some parade footage dates back to 1988 when the parade was co-branded with the Houston International Festival
- The Chase (1994) – filmed in the Rice Village area and several highways around the Houston area; one scene also shot in Kemah
- Jason's Lyric (1994) - set in Houston's Third, Fourth, and Fifth Ward including a scene at This Is It! Soul Food Restaurant, a local Houston eatery
- Reality Bites (1994)
- Thea (1994)
- Apollo 13 (1995) Johnson Space Center (box office #1 film in U.S.)
- Powder (1995) - filmed in Sugar Land, a Houston suburb, and some indoor scenes on a soundstage at Houston Studios in Downtown Houston
- The Evening Star (1996) - sequel to Terms of Endearment (1982)
- SubUrbia (1996) – filmed in Houston, Set in Austin, Texas
- Tin Cup (1996) – final tournament shot in Kingwood, Texas
- Prithvi (1997) - set in Houston, Texas
- Selena (1997) – Selena's final concert scene is set in the Astrodome, but filmed in San Antonio, Texas
- Armageddon (1998) – filmed at the Johnson Space Center facilities
- Dance With Me (1998)
- Fifth Ward (1998) – filmed in and set in Houston's Fifth Ward
- Rushmore (1998) – written and directed by Houstonian Wes Anderson; filmed at his alma mater, St. John's School, as well as Lamar High School and The Kinkaid School
- Arlington Road (1999) – filmed in Pearland, a Houston suburb, and at the University of Houston
- Mercy (2000)
- Space Cowboys (2000)
- Pearl Harbor (2001) - San Jacinto Battlefield State Memorial Site
- Texas Justice (2001-) – filmed in Houston
- Houston Medical (2002)
- Animal Cops: Houston (2003-2015)
- The Crooked E: The Unshredded Truth About Enron (2003) – set in Houston, but filmed in Canada
- Right on Track (2003) – Disney Channel movie set in Houston, but filmed in Utah
- Where's the Party Yaar? (2003) - also called Dude, Where's the Party; filmed entirely in Houston, about a nerdy Indian student who visits his hip nephew in Houston
- Suburban Madness (2004) - details the Clara Harris story
- Enron: The Smartest Guys in the Room (2005) – documentary about the Enron scandal
- Volver (2006) – Houston is mentioned briefly several times by a woman with cancer as a place where "they cure everything there"
- Fast Food Nation (2006) – filmed in several US cities, including Houston
- American Drug War: The Last White Hope (2007) – documentary with scenes in Houston
- Towelhead (2007) – set in a Houston suburb, but filmed in Los Angeles
- Crazy Heart (2009) - partly filmed in downtown Houston
- I Love You Phillip Morris (2009) - Set in and around this Houston area with references to Houston locations such as the Gulf Freeway and the Montrose District in Harris County. The real crimes of Steven Jay Russell mostly took place in Dallas. Filming happened in Miami, Los Angeles, and Louisiana
- Mao's Last Dancer (2009) - drama about the life of ballet dancer Li Cunxin; partly filmed in Houston at the China Garden Restaurant and JP Morgan Chase Tower downtown, Miller Outdoor Theatre in Hermann Park, and the Wortham Theater Center downtown; mostly filmed in Australia and Nanjing, China
- The Open Road (2009)
- Puncture (2011)
- Transformers: Dark of the Moon (2011) (box office #1 film in U.S.)
- Tree of Life (2011) – shot in Houston and other cities in Texas; starring Sean Penn and Brad Pitt
- My 600-lb Life - Filming is done at Dr. Younan Nowzaradan's office located at 4009 Bellaire Blvd. in Southside Place (Houston)
- Boyhood (2014) – directed by Richard Linklater; shot in Houston, Austin, San Marcos, Big Bend National Park, and other locations in Texas
- Draft Day (2014)
- Top Five (2014)
- The Martian (2015) (box office #1 film in the U.S.)
- 10 Cloverfield Lane (2016) sign that leads to Houston in the end of the movie
- Billion Dollar Buyer (2016-2018)
- Look Mom I Can Fly (2018)
- Red Rocket (2021)
- X (2022) begins in Houston
- Top Chef: Houston (2022)
- Apollo 10 1/2: A Space Age Childhood (2022) Set in Houston and the suburb of Clear Lake, featuring Johnson Space Center and Rice University.
- 80 for Brady (2023)
- Charliebird (2025)
