= List of films set in Portugal =

This list is of foreign films set in Portugal, at least in part. In the early 1940s, Portugal was the setting for over a dozen films, depicting the city as a place of "international intrigue". In subsequent decades, the trope of Lisbon as a city of espionage and foreign conflicts continued to endure, although films started to branch beyond this genre from the 1950s onward.

A

- April in Portugal (1954) — directed by Euan Lloyd, narrated by Trevor Howard and starring Jocelyn Lane

B

- Bis ans Ende der Welt (1991) — directed by Wim Wenders, starring William Hurt and Solveig Dommartin
- The Boys from Brazil (1978) — directed by Franklin J. Schaffner, starring Gregory Peck and Laurence Olivier

C

- Christopher Columbus: The Discovery (1992) — directed by John Glen, starring Marlon Brando and Tom Selleck
- Confessions of Felix Krull (1957) — directed by Kurt Hoffmann, starring Horst Buchholz and Liselotte Pulver
- Crash Landing (1958)

D

- The Dancer Upstairs (2002) — directed by John Malkovich, starring Javier Bardem and Juan Diego Botto

E

F

- Fados (2007) — directed by Carlos Saura, starring Mariza and Carlos do Carmo
- Fräulein Lausbub (1930) — directed by Erich Schönfelder, starring Julius Falkenstein and Dina Gralla

G

- Genealogies of a Crime (1997) — directed by Raúl Ruiz, starring Catherine Deneuve and Michel Piccoli

H

- The Hairy Ape (1944) — directed by Alfred Santell, starring William Bendix and Susan Hayward
- Hook, Line and Sinker (1969) – starring Jerry Lewis
- The House of the Spirits (1993) — directed by Bille August, starring Meryl Streep and Jeremy Irons

I

- I Deal in Danger (1966)
- In the White City (1983) — directed by Alain Tanner, starring Bruno Ganz and Teresa Madruga
- The Invisible Circus (2001) — directed by Adam Brooks, starring Cameron Diaz
- Indiana Jones and the Last Crusade (1989) — directed by Steven Spielberg, starring Harrison Ford and Sean Connery

J

- Jewels of Brandenburg (1947)

K

L

- The Lady Has Plans (1942)
- The Last Run (1971)— directed by Richard Fleischer, starring George C. Scott
- Les Lavandières du Portugal (1957) — directed by Pierre Gaspard-Huit, starring Jean-Claude Pascal, Anne Vernon, Paquita Rico and Darry Cowl.
- Lisbon (1956) — directed by Ray Milland, starring Ray Milland, Maureen O'Hara and Claude Rains
- Lisbon Story (1994) — directed by Wim Wenders
- The Lovers of Lisbon (1955) — directed by Henri Verneuil, starring Daniel Gélin and Françoise Arnoul

M

- Manmadhudu 2 (2019) — directed by Rahul Ravindran, starring Nagarjuna and Rakul Preet Singh
- The Miracle of Our Lady of Fatima (1952)

N

- The Night in Lisbon (1971) — directed by Zbyněk Brynych, starring Martin Benrath, Vadim Glowna, Erika Pluhar, Horst Frank, Charles Régnier
- The Ninth Gate (1999) — directed by Roman Polanski, starring Johnny Depp and Lena Olin

O

- On Her Majesty's Secret Service (1969) — directed by Peter R. Hunt, starring George Lazenby and Diana Rigg
- One Night in Lisbon (1941)

P

- Paisa Vasool (2017) — directed by Puri Jagannadh, starring Nandamuri Balakrishna

Q

R

- The Russia House (1990) — directed by Fred Schepisi, starring Sean Connery and Michelle Pfeiffer

S

- Satya Harishchandra (2017) — directed by Dayal Padmanabhan, starring Sharan and Sanchita Padukone
- The Second Awakening of Christa Klages (1978) — directed by Margarethe von Trotta, starring Tina Engel and Silvia Reize
- Shanghai Surprise (1986) — directed by Jim Goddard, starring Sean Penn and Madonna
- The State of Things (1982) — directed by Wim Wenders, starring Patrick Bauchau and Allen Garfield
- Storm Over Lisbon (1944)

T

- Taxi Lisboa (1996) — directed by Wolf Gaudlitz, starring Gerard Saaman and Josefina Lind
- Time Regained (1999) — directed by Raúl Ruiz, starring Catherine Deneuve, Emmanuelle Béart and John Malkovich
- Tombs of the Blind Dead (1971) — directed by Amando de Ossorio, starring Lone Fleming and César Burner
- The Tour Guide of Lisbon (1956) — directed by Hans Deppe, starring Vico Torriani

U

V

W

- War (2019) — directed by Siddharth Anand, starring Hrithik Roshan and Tiger Shroff
- With a Song in My Heart (1952)

X

Y

- Young Toscanini (1988) — directed by Franco Zeffirelli, starring Elizabeth Taylor and C. Thomas Howell

Z
