= List of films shot in Romania =

This is a list of films shot in Romania.

Year	Title	Starring	Location(s)
1991	Subspecies	Angus Scrimm, Anders Hove, Irina Movila	Prejmer, Bucharest
1993	Bloodstone: Subspecies 2	Anders Hove, Denice Duff, Kevin Spirtas	Bucharest
1994	Bloodlust: Subspecies 3	Anders Hove, Denice Duff, Kevin Spirtas	Bucharest
1998	Bloodstorm: Subspecies 4	Anders Hove, Denice Duff, Jonathon Morris	Bucharest
2002	Amen.	Ulrich Tukur, Mathieu Kassovitz, Sebastian Koch, Ulrich Mühe	Palace of the Parliament; Mogoșoaia Palace; House of the Free Press; Băneasa railway station
2003	Cold Mountain	Jude Law, Nicole Kidman, Renée Zellweger	Carpathian Mountains; Potigrafu, Prahova; Reci, Covasna; Bucharest
2004	Modigliani	Andy Garcia, Elsa Zylberstein	Bucharest
2004	Seed of Chucky	Brad Dourif, Jennifer Tilly, Billy Boyd	Bucharest
2005	An American Haunting	Donald Sutherland, Sissy Spacek	Bucharest; Curtea de Argeș
2005	BloodRayne	Kristanna Loken, Michael Madsen, Ben Kingsley, Michelle Rodriguez	Făgăraș Citadel; Corvin Castle; Hunedoara; Bran Castle; Bucharest; Sighișoara; Făgăraș
2005	The Cave	Cole Hauser, Lena Headey, Piper Perabo	Bucharest; Zărnești
2006	Borat	Sacha Baron Cohen	Glod, Dâmbovița; Moroeni, Dâmbovița; Bucharest
2006	Pulse	Kristen Bell, Ian Somerhalder, Christina Milian	Politehnica University of Bucharest
2006	Them	Olivia Bonamy, Michaël Cohen	Bucharest; Snagov, Ilfov
2007	Blood & Chocolate	Agnes Bruckner, Hugh Dancy, Olivier Martinez	Bucharest
2007	Youth Without Youth	Tim Roth, Alexandra Maria Lara, Bruno Ganz	Bucharest; Piatra Neamț; Sinaia; Brașov; Constanța
2008	Adam Resurrected	Jeff Goldblum, Willem Dafoe, Derek Jacobi, Ayelet Zurer	Bucharest
2008	Mirrors	Kiefer Sutherland, Paula Patton, Amy Smart	Bucharest Academy of Economic Studies; Bucharest
2008	The Brothers Bloom	Rachel Weisz, Adrien Brody, Mark Ruffalo	Peleș Castle; Constanța Casino; Bucharest; Sinaia; Comarnic; Constanța Shipyard; Constanța
2008	Transporter 3	Jason Statham	Bucharest
2009	The Concert	Aleksei Guskov, Mélanie Laurent, Miou-Miou	Bucharest
2010	Bunraku	Josh Hartnett, Demi Moore, Woody Harrelson	Bucharest
2010	The Whistleblower	Rachel Weisz, David Strathairn, Monica Bellucci	Bucharest
2011	Ghost Rider: Spirit of Vengeance	Nicolas Cage, Ciarán Hinds, Idris Elba	Transfăgărășan; Corvin Castle; Rovinari; Hunedoara; Bucharest; Fărcășești, Gorj; Sibiu; Lake Vidraru
2012	One in the Chamber	Cuba Gooding Jr., Dolph Lundgren	Brașov; Bucharest
2013	Charlie Countryman	Shia LaBeouf, Evan Rachel Wood, Mads Mikkelsen	Bucharest; Romanian Athenaeum; Macca-Vilacrosse Passage; Lipscani; Union Square, Bucharest; Bucharest Metro; Union Boulevard, Bucharest
2013	The Zero Theorem	Christoph Waltz, Mélanie Thierry, David Thewlis	Bucharest; Romanian Athenaeum; Carol Park, Bucharest; ICPE Technology Park, Bucharest
2014	Dying of the Light	Nicolas Cage, Anton Yelchin, Irène Jacob	Bucharest; Henri Coandă International Airport
2014	The Keeping Room	Brit Marling, Hailee Steinfeld, Sam Worthington	Poienarii de Argeș; Bucharest; Carpathian Mountains
2015	The Wave	Kristoffer Joner, Ane Dahl Torp	MediaPro Studios
2016	War Dogs	Jonah Hill, Miles Teller	Bucharest; Dâmbovița Center
2017	What Happened to Monday	Noomi Rapace, Willem Dafoe, Glenn Close	Constanța; Bucharest; Old Town, Constanța; Constanța Shipyard; Lipscani; National Library of Romania; National Theatre Bucharest; Magheru Boulevard, Bucharest
2018	The Nun	Demián Bichir, Taissa Farmiga	Sighișoara; Corvin Castle; Palace of the Parliament
2021	F9	Vin Diesel, John Cena, Michelle Rodriguez, Kurt Russell	Bucharest
