= List of films shot in Coquitlam =

A significant number of film and television productions are filmed in the city of Coquitlam, British Columbia. Popular filming locations include many productions at the Crease Clinic and West Lawn buildings of Riverview Hospital (The A-Team, Supernatural, Watchmen), Coquitlam Centre (Juno, The Sisterhood of the Traveling Pants), Minnekhada Regional Park (both New Moon and Eclipse from the Twilight series), council chambers at City Hall (court scenes for Da Vinci's Inquest), Centennial School (Aliens vs. Predator: Requiem), Mundy Park (Deck the Halls), the Fraser River industrial area of South Coquitlam, and the Coast Mountains of North Coquitlam.

== Feature films ==
- The A-Team (2010)
- Aliens vs. Predator: Requiem (2007)
- Along Came a Spider (2001)
- American Pie Presents: The Book of Love (2009)
- Case 39 (2009)
- The Day the Earth Stood Still (2008)
- Deck the Halls (2006)
- Disturbing Behavior (1998)
- Driven to Kill (2009)
- Duets (2000)
- Elegy (2008)
- The Entrance (2006)
- Eve and the Fire Horse (2005)
- Exception to the Rule (1997)
- Fantastic Four: Rise of the Silver Surfer (2007)
- Godzilla (2014)
- The Grey Fox (1982)
- The Hard Corps (2006)
- The Hitman (1991)
- Hot Rod (2007)
- If I Stay (2014)
- I'll Be Home for Christmas (1998)
- Jennifer Eight (1992)
- Jennifer's Body (2009)
- Jumanji (1995)
- Juno (2007)
- The Long Weekend (2005)
- Messages Deleted (2009)
- Romeo Must Die (2000)
- The Santa Clause 2 (2002)
- The Sisterhood of the Traveling Pants (2005)
- The Twilight Saga: Eclipse (2010)
- The Twilight Saga: New Moon (2009)
- Watchmen (2009)
- The X-Files: I Want to Believe (2008)

== Television series ==
- The 4400 (2004–2007)
- Arrow (2012–2020)
- Da Vinci's Inquest (1998–2005)
- Dark Angel (2000–2002)
- Falling Skies (2011-)
- Fringe (2008–2010)
- Millennium (1998)
- Psych (2006–2010)
- Reaper (2007–2009)
- Saved (2006)
- Smallville (2001–2010)
- Supernatural (2005–2010)
- Two (1996–1997)
- Viper (1994–1999)
- The X-Files (1993–1998)

== Television movies ==
- Don't Talk to Strangers (1994)
- I Was a Teenage Faust (2002)
- Killer Bash (2005)
- Killer Hair (2009)
- Numb (2007)
- The Time Tunnel (2002)
