= List of films set in Dallas =

A large number of movies have been filmed in Dallas, Texas, although not all of these are necessarily set in Dallas; for example RoboCop was filmed in Dallas but set in Detroit, Michigan. Conversely, many films set in Dallas were filmed elsewhere, including Dallas Buyers Club, which was filmed in New Orleans.

All of the movies and television shows listed below were filmed in Dallas unless noted otherwise.

- 1950, Dallas (movie)
- 1959, The Giant Gila Monster
- 1959, The Killer Shrews
- 1960, My Dog Buddy
- 1962, State Fair
- 1967, Bonnie and Clyde
- 1967, Mars Needs Women
- 1973, Executive Action
- 1974, Benji
- 1974, Phantom of the Paradise
- 1976, Logan's Run
- 1978, Cotton Candy (film)
- 1978-1991 Dallas (TV series)
- 1980, The Lathe of Heaven
- 1982, Silent Rage
- 1983, Silkwood
- 1983, Tender Mercies
- 1984, Places in the Heart
- 1984, Right to Kill?
- 1985, Target
- 1985, The Trip to Bountiful
- 1986, True Stories
- 1987, Paramedics
- 1987, RoboCop
- 1988, Dead Solid Perfect (HBO movie)
- 1988–1991, Gerbert (TV series)
- 1988, It Takes Two
- 1988, Il Nido del Ragno ("The Spider's Nest")
- 1988, Talk Radio
- 1988, The Thin Blue Line
- 1989, Born on the Fourth of July
- 1990, Problem Child
- 1991, JFK
- 1991, My Heroes Have Always Been Cowboys
- 1991, Necessary Roughness
- 1991, Steele's Law
- 1992, Leap of Faith
- 1992, Love Crimes
- 1992, Love Field
- 1992, Ruby
- 1993, Hexed
- 1993–2001, Walker, Texas Ranger (TV series)
- 1994, Blank Check
- 1994, Curse of the Starving Class
- 1995–1998, Wishbone (TV series)
- 1996, Bottle Rocket
- 1997, The Apostle
- 1997, Asteroid (TV movie)
- 1997, Batman & Robin
- 1997, It's in the Water
- 1998, Point Blank
- 1998, The X-Files: Fight the Future
- 1999, Any Given Sunday
- 1999, Boys Don't Cry
- 1999, Olive, the Other Reindeer (TV special; animated in Dallas)
- 1999, Universal Soldier: The Return
- 1999, Office Space
- 2000, Dr. T & the Women
- 2001, Jimmy Neutron: Boy Genius (animated in Dallas)
- 2001, Pendulum
- 2002–2007, The Adventures of Jimmy Neutron: Boy Genius (TV series; animated in Dallas)
- 2002, The Anarchist Cookbook
- 2002, The Rookie
- 2002, Serving Sara
- 2002, Slap Her... She's French
- 2003, Saving Jessica Lynch (TV movie)
- 2003, Deadly Cinema (TV series)
- 2004, The Ant Bully (animated in Dallas)
- 2004, The Benefactor (TV series)
- 2004, Primer
- 2006, The Night of the White Pants
- 2006–2008, Prison Break (TV series)
- 2009, Fissure
- 2010, Earthling
- 2010-2011, The Good Guys (TV series)
- 2011, The Tree of Life
- 2012, 9th Floor: Quest for the Ancient Relic
- 2012-2014 Dallas (TV series)
- 2013, Hoovey
- 2015, 11.22.63 (Hulu series)
- 2015–present, Queen of the South (TV series)
- 2017, LBJ
- 2017, The Gifted (TV series; pilot only)
- 2022, Parasocial (film)

In addition, numerous TV movies and "B movies" have been filmed in Dallas, as well as a few lesser-known, short-lived TV series.
