= List of films shot in Big Bear Valley =

This is an incomplete list of films shot in Big Bear Valley in the U.S. state of California.

== Films ==
Film Title	Year released	Location(s) Used	Ref(s)
When a Stranger Calls	2006	Running Springs	
Dr. Dolittle 2	2001	Big Bear City, Bluff Lake	
Gone with the Wind	1939	Big Bear Lake; Running Springs	
The Insider	1999	Big Bear Lake	
Magnolia	1999	Big Bear Lake	
Beethoven's 3rd	2000	Big Bear Lake, Bluff Lake	
WarGames	1983	Big Bear Lake	
Grey's Anatomy	2005-		
The King of Queens	1998-2007		
Average Joe	2003-2005		
Little Dove's Romance	1911		
The Call of the North	1914		
The Birth of a Nation	1915	Big Bear Lake	
Davy Crockett	1916	Big Bear Lake	
A Fight for Love	1919	Big Bear Lake	
The Courtship of Myles Standish	1923	Big Bear Lake	
Heidi	1937	Big Bear Lake	
Brigham Young	1940	Big Bear Lake	
High Sierra	1941	Big Bear Lake	
Lassie Come Home	1943	Big Bear Valley	
Magnificent Obsession	1954	Big Bear Lake	
Old Yeller	1957	Big Bear Lake	
Paint Your Wagon	1969	Holcomb Valley	
The Main Event	1979	Big Bear Lake; Cedar Lake	
The American President	1995	Big Bear Lake	
Fighting Trooper	1934	Big Bear Lake	
Sabretooth	2002	Big Bear Lake	
I'll Be Home for Christmas	1998	Big Bear Lake	
City of Angels	1998	Big Bear Lake	
Code of the Mounted	1935	Big Bear Lake	
Colorado Sundown	1952	Big Bear Lake	
Border Saddlemates	1952	Big Bear Lake; Virginia McDougald Fox Farm	
Riders of the Whistling Pines	1949	Big Bear Lake	
Trail of Robin Hood	1950	Big Bear Lake; Cedar Lake	
King Dinosaur	1955	Big Bear Lake	
Giant from the Unknown	1958	Big Bear Lake	
The Werewolf	1956	Big Bear Lake; Fawnskin	
Act of Violence	1949	Big Bear Lake	
Heart of the North	1938	Big Bear Lake	
Next	2007	Running Springs	
Small Town Saturday Night	2010	Running Springs	
I'm Reed Fish	2006	Running Springs	
Messenger of Death	1988	Running Springs	
Communion	1989	Running Springs	
Shane	1953	Big Bear Lake	
Woman Obsessed	1959	Big Bear	
Kissin' Cousins	1959	Big Bear Lake; Cedar Lake	
North West Mounted Police	1940	Big Bear Lake	
Law of the Northwest	1943	Big Bear Lake	
Through the Wrong Door	1919	Lucky Baldwin Mine (Holcomb Valley)	
Rocky Mountain Mystery	1935	Lucky Baldwin Mine (Holcomb Valley)	
Mona, the Mountain Maid	1914	Big Bear	
The White Scar	1915	Big Bear	
God's Country and the Woman	1916	Big Bear	
Broadway Arizona	1917	Big Bear	
Ace High	1918	Big Bear	
The Eagle	1918	Big Bear	
The Last of His People	1919	Big Bear	
The Wilderness Trail	1919	Big Bear	
The River's End	1920	Big Bear	
The High Land	1926	Big Bear	
Man of the Forest	1933	Big Bear	
To The Last Man	1933	Big Bear	
Fighting Shadows	1935	Big Bear	
Skull and Crown	1935	Big Bear	
Wilderness Mail	1935	Big Bear	
Drift Fence	1936	Big Bear	
Girl of the Ozarks	1936	Big Bear	
The Last of The Mohicans	1936	Big Bear	
Trail of the Lonesome Pine	1936	Big Bear	
Trigger Tom	1936	Big Bear	
King of the Royal Mounted	1940	Big Bear Lake	
Dillinger	1945	Cedar Lake	
Strangers in Paradise	1984	Cedar Lake	
The Heart of Humanity	1918	Big Bear Lake	
Deep Valley	1947	Bartlet’s Lake	
North of the Great Divide	1950	Cedar Lake; Big Bear Lake	
Don’t Fence Me In	1945	Cedar Lake; Big Bear Lake	
Untamed	1940	Cedar Lake	
Rites of Passage	1999	Big Bear Lake	
King of the Mounties	1942	Cedar Lake; Boulder Bay	
Trail of the Yukon	1949	Big Bear Lake	
Lumberjack	1944	Cedar Lake	
Frontiersman	1940	Cedar Lake	
Mrs. Mike	1949	Big Bear Lake	
Hound-Dog Man	1959	Big Bear Lake	
North to Alaska	1960	Big Bear Lake	
Canadian Mounted	1948	Big Bear Airport	
Law of the Timber	1941	Big Bear Lake	
Witchboard	1985	Big Bear Lake	
The Shepherd of the Hills	1941	Big Bear Lake	
Take a Letter, Darling	1942	Big Bear Lake	
Little Bigfoot	1997	Big Bear Lake; Cedar Lake	
Fear Runs Silent	1999	Big Bear Lake	
Doctor Dolittle	1998	Big Bear Lake	
The Last Shot	1993	Big Bear	
The Magnificent Ambersons	1942	Big Bear Lake	
Main Event	1947	Cedar Lake	
The Parent Trap (1961 film)	1961	Bluff Lake Camp	
