= List of films set in Glasgow =

The following is a list of notable films set in Glasgow, Scotland, or in which a significant scene takes place there. The list is sorted by the year the film was released.

== 1950s ==
- Madeleine (1950)
- The Maggie (1954)

== 1970s ==
- That Sinking Feeling (1979)

== 1980s ==
- Death Watch (1980)
- A Sense of Freedom (1981)
- Comfort and Joy (1984)
- Heavenly Pursuits (1986)

== 1990s ==
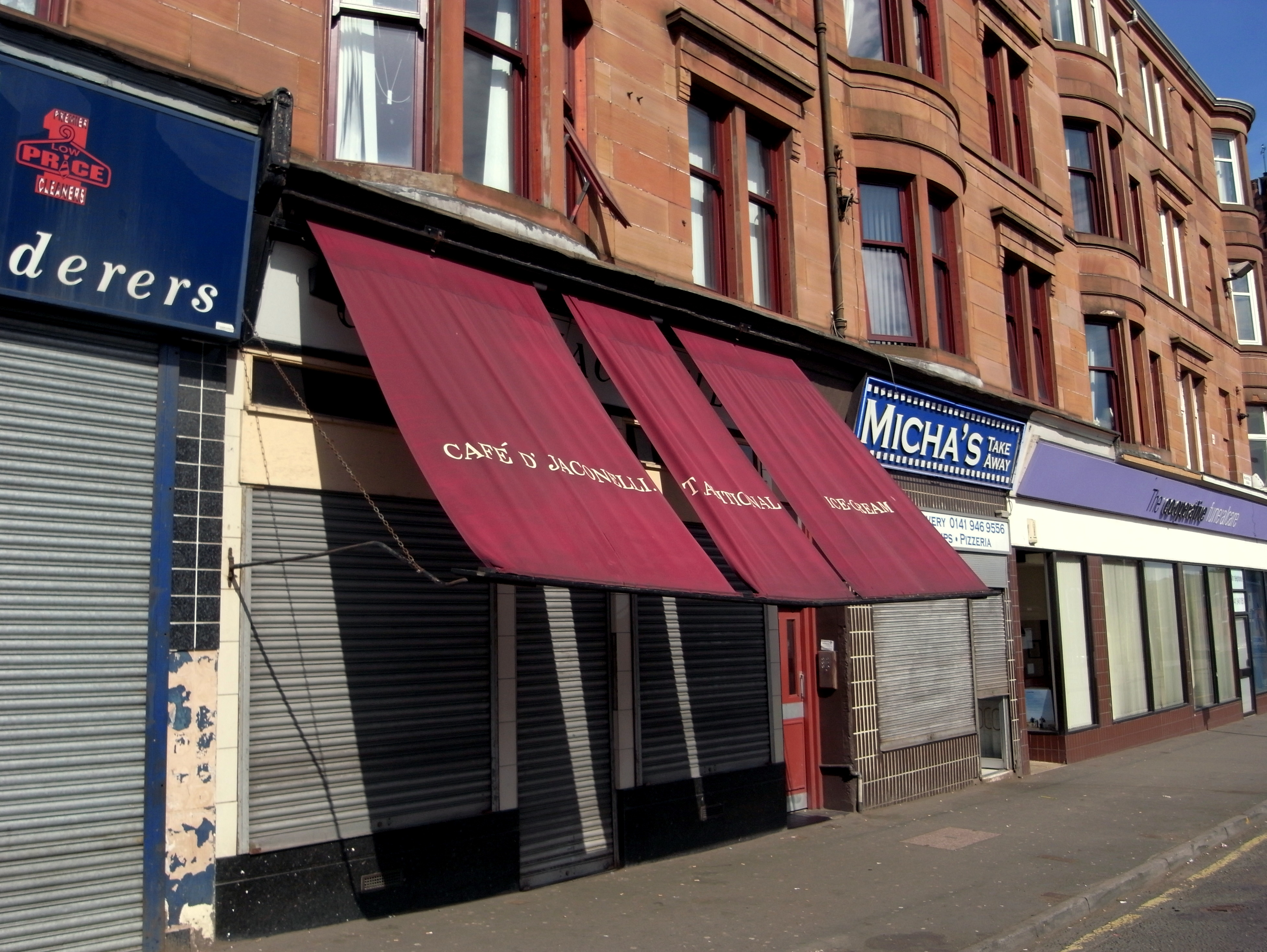
Café D'Jaconelli on Maryhill Road in Glasgow; the café from Trainspotting where Renton and Spud share a milkshake.

- Carla's Song (1996)
- Small Faces (1996)
- Trainspotting (1996)
- My Name is Joe (1998)
- Orphans (1998)
- Postmortem (1998)
- Ratcatcher (1999)

== 2000s ==
- Beautiful Creatures (2000)
- Late Night Shopping (2001)
- Strictly Sinatra (2001)
- Sweet Sixteen (2002)
- Wilbur Wants to Kill Himself (2002)
- Yeh Hai Jalwa (2002)
- American Cousins (2003)
- Skagerrak (2003)
- Young Adam (2003)
- Ae Fond Kiss... (2004)
- Dear Frankie (2004)
- On a Clear Day (2005)
- The Jacket (2005)
- Unleashed (2005)
- Nina's Heavenly Delights (2006)
- Red Road (2006)
- Doomsday (2008)

== 2010s ==
- Neds (2010)
- In Search Of La Che (2011)
- Perfect Sense (2011)
- Fast & Furious 6 (2013)
- Not Another Happy Ending (2013)
- Under the Skin (2013)
- World War Z (2013)
- God Help the Girl (2014)
- The Legend of Barney Thomson (2015)
- Wild Rose (2018)

== 2020s ==
- The Batman (2022)
- Girl (2023)
- Indiana Jones and the Dial of Destiny (2023)
- Tetris (2023)
- The Running Man (2025)
- Everybody to Kenmure Street (2026).
- Spider-Man: Brand New Day (2026)
