= List of films set in Sicily =

This is a list of films set in Sicily.

- L'avventura (1960)
- Baarìa (2009)
- Divorce, Italian Style (1961)
- Il Gattopardo (1963)
- The Godfather (1972)
- The Godfather Part II (1974)
- Jessica (1962)
- Malèna (2000)
- Nuovo Cinema Paradiso (1988)
- Purple Sea (2009)
- Stromboli (1950)
- La Terra Trema (1948)
- Porcile (1969)
