= List of films set in Patna =

The following is a list of films and documentaries set in Patna, India, however the list includes a number of films which only have a tenuous connection to the city. The list is sorted by the year the film was released

== 1950s ==
- Sabar Uparey (1955, Bengali)

== 1960s ==
- Ganga Maiyya Tohe Piyari Chadhaibo (1963, Bhojpuri)
- Laagi Nahi Chhute Ram (1963, Bhojpuri)

== 1970s ==
- Johny Mera Naam (1971, Hindi)
- Seemabaddha (1971, Bengali)
- Shaan E Khuda (1971)
- Dangal (1977, Bhojpuri)

== 1980s ==
- Apne Paraye (1980, Hindi)
- Gandhi (1982, English)

== 1990s ==
- Shool (1999, Hindi)

== 2000s ==
- Asoka (2001, Hindi)
- Gangaajal (2003, Hindi)
- Loknayak (2004, Hindi)
- Andhrudu (2005, Telugu)

== 2010s ==
- Satyamev Jayate (2010, Bhojpuri)
- Deswa (2011, Bhojpuri)
- Gangs of Wasseypur 2 (2012, Hindi)
- Rowdy Rathore (2012, Hindi)
- Jagadguru Adi Shankara (2013, Telugu)
- Mishan Impossible (2014, Telugu)
- Naya Pata (2014, Hindi)
- Poojai (2014, Tamil)
- Patna Se Pakistan (2015, Bhojpuri)
- M.S. Dhoni: The Untold Story (2016, Hindi)
- The Legend of Michael Mishra (2016, Hindi)
- Udta Punjab (2016, Hindi)
- Half Girlfriend (2017, Hindi)
- Running Shaadi (2017, Hindi)
- Voyage of the Southern Sun (2017, English)
- Mehandi Laga Ke Rakhna 2 (2018, Bhojpuri)
- PATNA WALE DULHANIYA LE JAYENGE (2018, Bhojpuri)
- India's Most Wanted (2019, Hindi)
- Jabariya Jodi (2019, Hindi)
- Paro Patnawali (2019, Bhojpuri)
- Super 30 (2019, Hindi)
- Rustum (2019, Kannada)

== 2020s ==
- Yaara (2020, Hindi)
- Patna ke Babu (2021, Bhojpuri)
- Patna Shuklla (2024, Hindi)
