= List of films shot in Prague =

This is a list of movies filmed in Prague, Czech Republic.

Movie	Year	Prague as	Notes
Amadeus	1984	Vienna	
Anthropoid	2016		
A Knight's Tale	2001		shot in Barrandov Studios
Babylon A.D.	2008		shot in Barrandov Studios
Blade II	2002		
Borg vs McEnroe	2017		
Casino Royale	2006	Miami, Venice, London	
Doom	2005		shot in Barrandov Studios
EuroTrip	2004	Paris, London, Vatican, Amsterdam, Bratislava and Berlin.	
Hellboy	2004	Moscow	
Hostel	2005	Amsterdam	
Kafka	1991		
Les Misérables	1998		
Mission: Impossible	1996		
Schindler's List	1993		
Snowpiercer	2013		shot in Barrandov Studios
The Bourne Identity	2002	Zurich	
The Chronicles of Narnia: The Lion, the Witch and the Wardrobe	2005		shot partially in Barrandov Studios
The Chronicles of Narnia: Prince Caspian	2008		shot in Barrandov Studios
The Death and Life of John F. Donovan	2018		
The Man with the Iron Heart	2017		Budapest doubled for Prague in many scenes
Spider-Man: Far From Home	2019		
The Spy Who Dumped Me	2018		
The Illusionist	2006	Vienna	
The Zookeeper's Wife	2017	Warsaw	
Underworld: Blood Wars	2016		
Unlocked	2017		
Van Helsing	2004		
Wanted	2008		
XXX	2002		
The League of Extraordinary Gentlemen	2003		
Swing Kids	1993		
The Gray Man	2022	Berlin, Baku, itself	
Yentl	1983	Bychawa, Poland	

TV series	Year	Prague as	Notes
The Young Indiana Jones Chronicles	1992-1993		
Borgia	2011 - 2014		
Britannia	2017 - ?		
Tannbach	2015 - ?		
Genius	2017 - ?		
Knightfall	2017 -		
Das Boot	2018 - ?		
McMafia	2018		
Outlander	2014 - ?	Paris, France	Radnické schody
World on Fire	2019	Warsaw, Berlin	
