= List of Zambian films =

This is a list of films produced in Zambia:

== 1980s ==
- Killing Heat (1981)

== 2010s ==
- I Am Not a Witch (2017)
- Love Is Not Enough (2018)

== 2020s ==
- Can You See Us? (2022)
