= List of films set in Rio de Janeiro =

This is a partial list of films set in Rio de Janeiro.

== B ==
- Blame It on Rio (1984)

== C ==
- Central Station (1998)
- Charlie Chan in Rio (1941)
- City of God (2002)
- City of Men (2007)

== D ==
- Double Trouble (1984)
- Dhoom 2 (2006)

== E ==
- Elite Squad (2007)
- Elite Squad: The Enemy Within (2010)
- Emmanuelle in Rio (2003)

== F ==
- Fast Five (2011)
- Favela Rising (2005)
- Flying Down to Rio (1933)
- Four Days in September (1997)
- From Beginning to End (2009)
- Fletch

== G ==
- Girl from Rio (2001)
- The Girl from Rio (1969)
- Godzilla: King of the Monsters (2019) (briefly)
- Godzilla x Kong: The New Empire (2024)

== H ==
- L'homme de Rio (1964)

== I ==
- The Incredible Hulk (2008)

== K ==
- Kickboxer 3: The Art of War (1992)

== L ==
- Latin Lovers (1953)

== M ==
- Moonraker (1979)

== O ==
- Orfeu Negro (1959)
- OSS 117: Lost in Rio (2009)
- OSS 117 Mission for a Killer (1965)

== P ==
- Penguins of Madagascar (2014) (briefly)

== R ==
- Reaching for the Moon (2013)
- Rio (1939)
- Rio (2011)
- Rio 2 (2014) (beginning)
- Rio, I Love You (2014)
- Rio 2096: A Story of Love and Fury (2013)
- Rio Sex Comedy (2010)
- Road to Rio (1947)

== S ==
- Saludos Amigos (1943)

== T ==
- That Night in Rio (1941)
- The Twilight Saga: Breaking Dawn – Part 1 (2011)
- The Pebble and the Penguin (1995)
- The Producers (2005) (briefly)
- Trash (2014)

== W ==
- Wild Orchid (1989)
