= List of films set in Washington, D.C. =

This is a list of feature films set in Washington, D.C.

Released	Title	Director	Comments	Filmed in DC
2022	The 355	Simon Kinberg		check
2009	2012	Roland Emmerich		check
1997	Absolute Power	Clint Eastwood		check
2015	Accidental Love	David O. Russell		check
2016	The Accountant	Gavin O'Connor		
1962	Advise & Consent	Otto Preminger	Main setting	check
2018	Affairs of State	Eric Bross		
1997	Air Force One	Wolfgang Petersen		check
1976	All the President's Men	Alan J. Pakula	Main setting, National Film Registry	check
2016	All the Way	Jay Roach	Main setting	
2001	Along Came a Spider	Lee Tamahori		
1995	The American President	Rob Reiner	Main setting	check
1997	Amistad	Steven Spielberg		
2019	Angel Has Fallen	Ric Roman Waugh		
1982	Annie	John Huston		
2015	Ant-Man	Peyton Reed		
2012	Argo	Ben Affleck		check
1999	Arlington Road	Mark Pellington	Main setting	check
1998	Armageddon	Michael Bay		check
1992	Article 99	Howard Deutch		
1987	Assassination	Peter R. Hunt		
2020	The Banker	George Nolfi		
2016	Batman v Superman: Dawn of Justice	Zack Snyder		check
2012	Battleship	Peter Berg		
1996	Beavis and Butt-Head Do America	Mike Judge		
1979	Being There	Hal Ashby	Main setting, National Film Registry	check
1999	Bicentennial Man	Chris Columbus		
1977	Billy Jack Goes to Washington	Tom Laughlin	Main setting	
2009	Black Dynamite	Scott Sanders		
1977	Black Sunday	John Frankenheimer		
2022	Blacklight	Mark Williams		check
2013	Blue Caprice	Alexandre Moors		
2008	Body of Lies	Ridley Scott		check
1992	Boomerang	Reginald Hudlin		
2008	Borat	Larry Charles		check
1950	Born Yesterday	George Cukor	National Film Registry	check
1993	Born Yesterday	Luis Mandoki		
2012	The Bourne Legacy	Tony Gilroy		
2007	Breach	Billy Ray	Main setting	check
2015	Bridge of Spies	Steven Spielberg		
1987	Broadcast News	James L. Brooks	Main setting, National Film Registry	check
2008	Burn After Reading	Joel Coen, Ethan Coen		check
2013	The Butler	Lee Daniels	Main setting	
1995	Canadian Bacon	Michael Moore		
1972	The Candidate	Michael Ritchie		
2025	Captain America: Brave New World	Julius Onah	Main setting	check
2014	Captain America: The Winter Soldier	Anthony Russo, Joe Russo	Main setting	check
2010	Casino Jack	George Hickenlooper		
1996	Chain Reaction	Andrew Davis		check
1989	Chances Are	Emile Ardolino	Main setting	check
2007	Charlie Wilson's War	Mike Nichols		
2004	Chasing Liberty	Andy Cadiff		check
2024	Civil War	Alex Garland	Main setting	
1994	Clear and Present Danger	Phillip Noyce		check
2002	Collateral Damage	Andrew Davis		check
2015	Concussion	Peter Landesman		
1997	Contact	Robert Zemeckis		check
2000	The Contender	Rod Lurie	Main setting	
2003	The Core	Jon Amiel		
1996	Courage Under Fire	Edward Zwick		check
1955	The Court-Martial of Billy Mitchell	Otto Preminger		
1947	Crossfire	Edward Dmytryk		
1983	D.C. Cab	Joel Schumacher	Main setting	check
1958	Damn Yankees	George Abbott, Stanley Donen		check
1983	Daniel	Sidney Lumet		
1993	Dave	Ivan Reitman	Main setting	check
2004	The Day After Tomorrow	Roland Emmerich		check
1951	The Day the Earth Stood Still	Robert Wise	National Film Registry	check
1998	Deep Impact	Mimi Leder		check
2004	The Defender	Dolph Lundgren		
1999	Dick	Andrew Fleming	Main setting	check
1990	Die Hard 2	Renny Harlin		
1992	The Distinguished Gentleman	Jonathan Lynn		
1991	Doc Hollywood	Michael Caton-Jones		
2021	Don't Look Up	Adam McKay		check
2011	The Double	Michael Brandt		check
1944	The Doughgirls	James V. Kern		
1964	Dr. Strangelove or: How I Learned to Stop Worrying and Love the Bomb	Stanley Kubrick	Main setting, National Film Registry	
1994	Drop Zone	John Badham		
2004	Eagle Eye	D. J. Caruso		check
1956	Earth vs. the Flying Saucers	Fred F. Sears		
2013	The East	Zal Batmanglij		check
2006	Eight Below	Frank Marshall		
1999	Election	Alexander Payne		check
2016	Elvis & Nixon	Liza Johnson		
2002	The Emperor's Club	Michael Hoffman		
2006	End Game	Andy Cheng		
1998	Enemy of the State	Tony Scott		check
1996	Eraser	Chuck Russell		check
2007	Evan Almighty	Tom Shadyac		check
1973	Executive Action	David Miller		
1996	Executive Decision	Stuart Baird		
1973	The Exorcist	William Friedkin	Main setting, National Film Registry, see Exorcist steps	check
1990	The Exorcist III	William Peter Blatty		check
1964	Fail Safe	Sidney Lumet		
2010	Fair Game	Doug Liman		check
2011	Fast Five	Justin Lin		
1951	FBI Girl	William A. Berke		
1959	The FBI Story	Mervyn LeRoy		
1992	A Few Good Men	Rob Reiner		check
1980	The Fiendish Plot of Dr. Fu Manchu	Piers Haggard		
2013	The Fifth Estate	Bill Condon		
1993	The Firm	Sydney Pollack		check
2004	First Daughter	Forest Whitaker		
1980	First Family	Buck Henry		
1996	First Kid	David M. Evans		check
1948	For the Love of Mary	Frederick de Cordova		
1994	Forrest Gump	Robert Zemeckis	National Film Registry	check
1971	The French Connection	William Friedkin	National Film Registry	check
2008	Frost/Nixon	Ron Howard		
1997	G.I. Jane	Ridley Scott		check
2013	G.I. Joe: Retaliation	Jon M. Chu		check
2009	G.I. Joe: The Rise of Cobra	Stephen Sommers		
1933	Gabriel Over the White House	Gregory La Cava		
2019	Georgetown	Christoph Waltz	Main setting	
2017	Geostorm	Dean Devlin		
1996	Get on the Bus	Spike Lee		
2008	Get Smart	Peter Segal	Main setting	check
2023	Ghosted	Dexter Fletcher	Main setting	check
2012	Goats	Christopher Neil		
1974	The Godfather Part II	Francis Ford Coppola	National Film Registry	check
2019	Godzilla: King of the Monsters	Michael Dougherty		
2013	A Good Day to Die Hard	John Moore		
2006	The Good Shepherd	Robert De Niro		check
1986	Good to Go	Blaine Novak		
1943	Government Girl	Dudley Nichols		
2022	The Gray Man	Anthony Russo, Joe Russo		
1978	The Greek Tycoon	J. Lee Thompson		
1979	Hair	Miloš Forman		
2001	Hannibal	Ridley Scott		check
2011	Haywire	Steven Soderbergh		
2003	Head of State	Chris Rock		check
1986	Heartburn	Mike Nichols		
2000	Hollow Man	Paul Verhoeven		check
1980	Hopscotch	Ronald Neame		
1997	The House of Yes	Mark Waters		
1958	Houseboat	Melville Shavelson		check
2010	How Do You Know	James L. Brooks		check
2018	Hunter Killer	Donovan Marsh		
1997	I Think I Do	Brian Sloan		
2016	I.T.	Melville Shavelson		
2006	Idiocracy	Mike Judge	Main setting	
1993	In the Line of Fire	Wolfgang Petersen		check
2009	In the Loop	Armando Iannucci	Main setting	check
1996	Independence Day	Roland Emmerich		check
2016	Independence Day: Resurgence	Roland Emmerich		
2007	The Invasion	Oliver Hirschbiegel		check
2019	The Irishman	Martin Scorsese		
2010	Iron Man 2	Jon Favreau		
2013	Iron Man 3	Shane Black		
2020	Irresistible	Jon Stewart		
2011	J. Edgar	Clint Eastwood	Main setting	check
2016	Jack Reacher: Never Go Back	Edward Zwick		check
2014	Jack Ryan: Shadow Recruit	Kenneth Branagh		
1997	The Jackal	Michael Caton-Jones		check
2016	Jackie	Pablo Larraín	Main setting	check
2016	Jason Bourne	Paul Greengrass		check
1991	JFK	Oliver Stone		check
2010	Jonah Hex	Jimmy Hayward		
1938	Judge Hardy's Children	George B. Seitz		
2014	Kill the Messenger	Michael Cuesta		check
2023	Killers of the Flower Moon	Martin Scorsese		
2014	Kingsman: The Secret Service	Matthew Vaughn		
2017	Kingsman: The Golden Circle	Matthew Vaughn		
1997	Kiss the Girls	Gary Fleder		
1964	Kisses for My President	Curtis Bernhardt		
2017	Kong: Skull Island	Jordan Vogt-Roberts		
1944	Ladies of Washington	Louis King		
1973	The Last Detail	Hal Ashby		check
2019	The Last Full Measure	Todd Robinson		check
2016	LBJ	Rob Reiner		check
2003	Legally Blonde 2: Red, White & Blonde	Charles Herman-Wurmfeld	Main setting	
2013	Life of a King	Jake Goldberger		
2012	Lincoln	Steven Spielberg	Main setting	
2007	Lions for Lambs	Robert Redford	Main setting	check
2007	Live Free or Die Hard	Len Wiseman		check
1992	Live Wire	Christian Duguay		
2012	Lockout	James Mather, Stephen Saint Leger		
1976	Logan's Run	Michael Anderson		
2016	London Has Fallen	Babak Najafi		
1939	The Lone Wolf Spy Hunt	Peter Godfrey		
2019	Long Shot	Jonathan Levine		
2010	Lost Boys: The Thirst	Dario Piana		
2016	Loving	Jeff Nichols		
2010	MacGruber	Jorma Taccone		
1946	Magnificent Doll	Frank Borzage		
1955	A Man Called Peter	Henry Koster		
1983	The Man Who Wasn't There	Bruce Malmuth		
1985	The Man with One Red Shoe	Stan Dragoti		
1972	The Man	Joseph Sargent		
1986	Manhunter	Michael Mann		check
1962	The Manchurian Candidate	John Frankenheimer		check
2004	The Manchurian Candidate	Jonathan Demme		check
1996	Mars Attacks!	Tim Burton		check
2002	The Master of Disguise	Perry Andelin Blake		
2021	The Mauritanian	Kevin Macdonald		check
2007	Max 2: White House Hero	Brian Levant		
1936	A Message to Garcia	George Marshall		
1979	Meteor	Ronald Neame		
1993	The Meteor Man	Robert Townsend		
2002	Minority Report	Steven Spielberg	Main setting	check
2016	Miss Sloane	John Madden		
1943	Mission to Moscow	Michael Curtiz		
2015	Mission: Impossible – Rogue Nation	Christopher McQuarrie		
1943	The More the Merrier	George Stevens		
1987	Morgan Stewart's Coming Home	Alan Smithee		
2002	The Mothman Prophecies	Mark Pellington		check
1939	Mr. Smith Goes to Washington	Frank Capra	Main setting, National Film Registry	check
1997	Murder at 1600	Dwight H. Little	Main setting	check
1996	My Fellow Americans	Peter Segal		check
2020	My Spy	Peter Segal		
1991	The Naked Gun 2½: The Smell of Fear	David Zucker		check
1995	National Lampoon's Senior Trip	Kelly Makin		
2004	National Treasure	Jon Turteltaub	Main setting	check
2007	National Treasure: Book of Secrets	Jon Turteltaub		check
1990	Navy SEALs	Lewis Teague		
1995	The Net	Irwin Winkler		check
2009	Night at the Museum: Battle of the Smithsonian	Shawn Levy	Main setting	check
1995	Nixon	Oliver Stone	Main setting	check
1987	No Way Out	Roger Donaldson	Main setting	check
2014	Non-Stop	Jaume Collet-Serra		
2008	Nothing but the Truth	Rod Lurie		
2013	Olympus Has Fallen	Antoine Fuqua	Main setting	
1976	The Omen	Richard Donner		
2023	Oppenheimer	Christopher Nolan		
2013	Parkland	Peter Landesman		
1992	Patriot Games	Phillip Noyce		check
2001	Pearl Harbor	Michael Bay		
1993	The Pelican Brief	Alan J. Pakula		check
1996	The People vs. Larry Flynt	Miloš Forman		
2013	Philomena	Stephen Frears		check
2015	Pixels	Chris Columbus		check
1959	Plan 9 from Outer Space	Ed Wood		check
2001	Planet of the Apes	Tim Burton		check
1993	Point of No Return	John Badham		
2017	The Post	Steven Spielberg	Main setting	check
1986	Power	Sidney Lumet		
1934	The President Vanishes	William A. Wellman		
1967	The President's Analyst	Theodore J. Flicker		
1998	Primary Colors	Mike Nichols		
1977	The Private Files of J. Edgar Hoover	Larry Cohen		
1997	Private Parts	Betty Thomas		check
1984	Protocol	Herbert Ross		
2016	The Purge: Election Year	James DeMonaco		
1994	Quiz Show	Robert Redford		check
1981	Raiders of the Lost Ark	Steven Spielberg	National Film Registry	check
2002	Red Dragon	Brett Ratner		check
1935	Red Salute	Sidney Lanfield		
2007	Rendition	Gavin Hood		check
2019	The Report	Scott Z. Burns	Main setting	
2012	Resident Evil: Retribution	Paul W. S. Anderson		
2023	The Retirement Plan	Tim Brown		
1983	The Right Stuff	Philip Kaufman	National Film Registry	
2014	RoboCop	José Padilha		
1996	The Rock	Michael Bay		
1992	Running Mates	Michael Lindsay-Hogg		
2023	Rustin	George C. Wolfe	Main setting	check
2010	Salt	Phillip Noyce		check
1940	Santa Fe Trail	Michael Curtiz		
2003	Scary Movie 3	David Zucker		check
1973	Scorpio	Michael Winner		
1946	The Searching Wind	William Dieterle		
1979	The Seduction of Joe Tynan	Jerry Schatzberg		
2006	The Sentinel	Clark Johnson		check
1918	The Service Star	Charles Miller		
1964	Seven Days in May	John Frankenheimer		check
1985	Seven Minutes in Heaven	Linda Feferman		
1997	Shadow Conspiracy	George P. Cosmatos		check
2003	Shattered Glass	Billy Ray	Main setting	check
1943	Sherlock Holmes in Washington	Roy William Neill		
2024	Shirley	John Ridley		check
1998	The Siege	Edward Zwick		
1991	The Silence of the Lambs	Jonathan Demme	National Film Registry	check
2007	The Simpsons Movie	David Silverman		
1998	Slam	Marc Levin		
1943	So This Is Washington	Ray McCarey		
1956	The Solid Gold Cadillac	Richard Quine		
2020	Sonic the Hedgehog	Jeff Fowler		
2017	Spider-Man: Homecoming	Jon Watts		check
2019	Spies in Disguise	Troy Quane, Nick Bruno		
2001	Spy Game	Tony Scott		check
1985	St. Elmo's Fire	Joel Schumacher	Main setting	check
2009	State of Play	Kevin Macdonald	Main setting	check
2005	Stealth	Rob Cohen		
1999	Storm Catcher	Tony Hickox		
1951	Strangers on a Train	Alfred Hitchcock		check
1998	Streetwise	Bruce Brown		
2016	Suicide Squad	David Ayer		
2002	The Sum of All Fears	Phil Alden Robinson		check
1980	Superman II	Richard Lester		
1987	Suspect	Peter Yates		check
2005	Syriana	Stephen Gaghan		check
2007	Talk to Me	Kasi Lemmons		
2004	Team America: World Police	Trey Parker		
2013	Temptation: Confessions of a Marriage Counselor	Tyler Perry		
1927	A Texas Steer	Richard Wallace		
2005	Thank You for Smoking	Jason Reitman	Main setting	check
1943	They Got Me Covered	David Butler		
1952	The Thief	Russell Rouse		
2000	Thirteen Days	Roger Donaldson	Main setting	check
1975	Three Days of the Condor	Sydney Pollack	Main setting	check
1992	Thunderheart	Michael Apted		
1994	Timecop	Peter Hyams		
1972	Top of the Heap	Christopher St. John		
1970	Tora! Tora! Tora!	Richard Fleischer, Toshio Masuda, Kinji Fukasaku		check
2000	Traffic	Steven Soderbergh		check
2007	Transformers	Michael Bay		check
2011	Transformers: Dark of the Moon	Michael Bay		check
2009	Transformers: Revenge of the Fallen	Michael Bay		check
2017	Transformers: The Last Knight	Michael Bay		
1994	True Lies	James Cameron	Main setting	check
2015	Trumbo	Jay Roach		
2018	Uncle Drew	Charles Stone III		
2024	Unfrosted	Jerry Seinfeld		
1916	The Velvet Paw	Maurice Tourneur		
2018	Vice	Adam McKay	Main setting	check
2008	W.	Oliver Stone	Main setting	
1997	Wag the Dog	Barry Levinson	Main setting	check
2007	The Walker	Paul Schrader		
1942	The War Against Mrs. Hadley	Harold S. Bucquet		
1932	Washington Merry-Go-Round	James Cruze		
1943	Watch on the Rhine	Herman Shumlin		
2009	Watchmen	Zack Snyder		
2005	Wedding Crashers	David Dobkin	Main setting	check
1973	The Werewolf of Washington	Milton Moses Ginsberg		
1964	What a Way to Go!	J. Lee Thompson		
1951	When Worlds Collide	Rudolph Maté		
2013	White House Down	Roland Emmerich	Main setting	check
1967	Who's Minding the Mint?	Howard Morris		
1999	Wild Wild West	Barry Sonnenfeld		
1945	Without Love	Harold S. Bucquet		
2021	Without Remorse	Stefano Sollima		check
2020	Wonder Woman 1984	Patty Jenkins	Main setting	check
2021	Worth	Sara Colangelo		
1998	The X-Files	Rob Bowman		
2008	The X-Files: I Want to Believe	Chris Carter		
2000	X-Men	Bryan Singer		
2016	X-Men: Apocalypse	Bryan Singer		
2014	X-Men: Days of Future Past	Bryan Singer		
2011	X-Men: First Class	Matthew Vaughn		check
2003	X2	Bryan Singer		
2005	XXX: State of the Union	Lee Tamahori		check
1942	Yankee Doodle Dandy	Michael Curtiz	National Film Registry	check
2012	Zero Dark Thirty	Kathryn Bigelow		
2009	Zombieland	Ruben Fleischer		
2019	Zombieland: Double Tap	Ruben Fleischer		
