= List of television shows and films set in Charleston, South Carolina =

Because of its classic Old South buildings and scenery, Charleston, South Carolina has been featured in many films and television shows.

== Television shows ==
The following television shows have been filmed in part in or near Charleston, South Carolina. Filming locations that are identifiable in the final production are indicated in parentheses. When the filming location was meant to represent Charleston as the setting, an asterisk has been added.

- Army Wives, mainly filmed at the old Navy base, in the City of North Charleston, where they built a fake town for the series; a sound stage for the show is located in the Oakridge Shopping Center off Dorchester Road, in the City of North Charleston; 2007-13 (*)
- Deadly Pursuits, 1996 TV movie with Tori Spelling (*)
- Pilot episode for miniseries El Cid, dramatization of the lives of Citadel cadets; Citadel campus (*)
- The 1990s Nickelodeon show Gullah Gullah Island took place on a fictional barrier island near Charleston, South Carolina; one episode featured the family visiting downtown Charleston, showing things like sweet-grass baskets; 1994-98 (*)
- TV movie The Hunley on TNT
- The Inspectors on CBS; 2015-2019
- ABC TV miniseries of the trilogy of North and South (1994, starring Patrick Swayze and Kirstie Alley), Love and War, Heaven & Hell: North & South, Book III; Calhoun Mansion at 16 Meeting St. and Boone Hall Plantation (*)
- Palmetto Pointe (*)
- The Learning Channel series The Real Estate Pros with local real estate agency Trademark Properties and its owner Richard C. Davis, 2007 (*)
- Reckless, 2014, CBS (*)
- Scarlett, 1994 TV miniseries based on Alexandra Ripley's sequel to Gone with the Wind (*)
- Southern Charm, 2014–present, Bravo reality show (*)
- Special Bulletin, a 1983 TV-film on NBC presented as a simulated news broadcast of a nuclear terrorism-related hostage taking and subsequent nuclear explosion resulting in the total destruction of the City of Charleston (*)
- Vice Principals Filmed in the North Charleston, South Carolina in the neighborhood of Park Circle. Scenes that take place in the school were shot on the campus of R.B. Stall High School and also filmed on campus of West Ashley High School.
- Top Chef Season 14
- Outer Banks
- The Righteous Gemstones

== Films ==
The following movies were filmed at least in part in Charleston, South Carolina. Identifiable locations shown in the films are indicated in parentheses. When the filming location was meant to represent Charleston as the setting, an asterisk has been added.

- Ace Ventura: When Nature Calls (1995) (box office #1 film in the U.S.)
- Angel Camouflaged (2010)
- Bab's Candidate (1920) (also shot in Summerville, South Carolina)
- The Break (1995)
- Carolina (1934)
- Chasers (1994)
- Cold Mountain (2003)
- Consenting Adults (1992)
- The Corn Dog Man
- The Crimson Flash (1927) (also filmed at The Oaks, a country house in Goose Creek, South Carolina)
- The Dangerous Lives of Altar Boys (2002)
- Deceiver
- Dear John(*)
- Dear Osama bin Laden
- Die Hard with a Vengeance (1995) (old Cooper River bridges)
- Don't Tell Her It's Me (aka The Boyfriend School)
- The Double McGuffin (1979)
- For the Boys (1991)
- G.I. Joe: Retaliation (2013) (has a scene set at Fort Sumter in Charleston Harbor), #1 film in the U.S.
- The Great Santini (1979)(*)
- Guilty of Love (1918)
- Halloween (2018 film) (2018) (filmed at Magnolia Cemetery and Hampton Park Terrace), #1 film in the U.S.
- How Could You, Caroline? (1918)
- The In Crowd (2000)
- The Jackal (1997)
- Kitty Kitty
- The Legend of Bagger Vance (2000)
- Leo (2000)
- Little Miss Rebellion (1918)
- Little Senegal
- Look Out, Here Comes Tomorrow
- The Lords of Discipline (1983)(*)
- Major League: Back to the Minors 1998
- Mary Jane's Last Dance
- My Man Done Me Wrong
- The New Daughter (2009) Kevin Costner (filmed at The Wedge Plantation in McClellanville and in Hampton Park Terrace)
- The North Wind's Malice (1918)
- The Notebook (2004) (Upper King St. near Cannon St. and Spring St., and Boone Hall Plantation and Cypress Gardens, Moncks Corner)
- O (2001) (*)
- An Occasional Hell
- On Her Way (1918)
- Other Voices, Other Rooms
- The Patriot (2000) (College of Charleston, lower Meeting St. and Cypress Gardens in Goose Creek) (*)
- The Prince of Tides (1991)
- Quiet Victory: The Charlie Wedemeyer Story
- Reap the Wild Wind (1942)
- Rich in Love (1992)
- Suncoast (2024)
- Swamp Thing (1982)
- Thin Ice (1981)
- White Squall (1996)
- Wildfire (1915)
