= List of films shot in Oxford =

A 2018 article in the Times cited Oxford as a "perfect backdrop for [both] big and small screen[s]". The following is a list of films that were filmed wholly or partially in Oxford, England (often featuring the University of Oxford):

- From Russia with Love (1963)
- Accident (1967)
- The Italian Job (1969)
- Heaven's Gate - Harvard commencement sequences shot in New College Lane, the Sheldonian Theatre and at Mansfield College in 1980.
- Privileged (1982)
- Another Country (1984)
- Oxford Blues (1984)
- Young Sherlock Holmes (1984)
- A Fish Called Wanda (1988)
- Howards End (1992)
- Shadowlands (1993)
- The Madness of King George (1994)
- True Blue (1996)
- The Saint (1997)
- Wilde (1997)
- The Red Violin (1998)
- Saving Private Ryan (1998)
- Mohabbatein (2000) (Bollywood film)
- 102 Dalmatians (2000)
- Quills (2000)
- Iris (2001)
- Harry Potter and the Philosopher’s Stone (2001)
- Harry Potter and the Chamber of Secrets (2002)
- Harry Potter and the Goblet of Fire (2005)
- Pocahontas: The New World (2005)
- Bhagam Bhag (2006) (Bollywood film)
- Blue Blood (2006)
- The History Boys (2006)
- The Golden Compass (2007)
- Salaam-e-Ishq (2007) (Bollywood film)
- Brideshead Revisited (2008)
- I Can't Think Straight (2008)
- The Oxford Murders (2008)
- An Education (2009)
- Alice in Wonderland (2010)
- Robinson in Ruins (2010)
- X-Men: First Class (2011)
- Desi Boyz (2011)
- Belle (2013)
- The Riot Club (2014)
- Doctor Strange (2016)
- Transformers: The Last Knight (2017)
- The Mummy (2017)
- The Favourite (2018)
- Mamma Mia! Here We Go Again (2018)
- On Chesil Beach (2018)
- Tolkien (2019)
- Jurassic World Dominion (2022)
- Surprised by Oxford (2022)
- Saltburn (2023)
- Wonka (2023)
- My Oxford Year (2025)
- Your Fault: London (unreleased)
- &Sons (David Gilbert novel) adaptation (unreleased)
