= List of television shows and movies in Minnesota =

Many television shows and/or films have been filmed or set in the U.S. state of Minnesota.

== Films ==
- The Adventures of Rocky and Bullwinkle (2000)
- Airport (1970) (box office #1 film in the U.S.)
- An American Romance (1944)
- Angus (1995)
- Aurora Borealis (2006)
- Beautiful Girls (1996)
- Best Man Down (2012)
- Big Bully (1996)
- The Big One (1997)
- Bill (1981)
- The Bishop's Wife (1947)
- Bloodstained Memoirs (2009)
- Clouds (2020)
- Cologne: From the Diary of Ray and Esther (1939)
- Contagion (2011) (box office #1 film in the U.S.)
- Crossing the Bridge (1992)
- The Cure (1995)
- D2: The Mighty Ducks (1994) (box office #1 film in the U.S.)
- D3: The Mighty Ducks (1996)
- Dead of Winter (2025)
- Dear White People (2014)
- Drop Dead Fred (1991)
- Drop Dead Gorgeous (1999)
- Embrace of the Vampire (1995)
- The Emigrants (1971)
- Equinox (1992)
- The Eyes of Tammy Faye (2000)
- Factotum (2005)
- Fargo (1996)
- Feeling Minnesota (1996)
- Foolin' Around (1980)
- Ghost from the Machine (2010)
- God's Country (1985)
- The Good Son (1993)
- Graffiti Bridge (1990)
- The Great Northfield Minnesota Raid (1972)
- Grumpier Old Men (1995)
- Grumpy Old Men (1993)
- The Heartbreak Kid (1972)
- Here On Earth (2000)
- Herman U. S. A. (2001)
- I Am Not a Serial Killer (2016)
- Ice Castles (1978)
- Inside Out (2015)
- Into Temptation (2009)
- Iron Will (1994)
- Jennifer's Body (2009)
- Jingle All the Way (1996)
- Joe Somebody (2001)
- Juno (2007)
- Killer Movie (2008)
- Kumiko, the Treasure Hunter (2014)
- Leatherheads (2008)
- Life Partners (2014)
- Little Big League (1994)
- Los Enchiladas! (1999)
- Major League: Back to the Minors (1998)
- Mallrats (1995)
- Martha, Meet Frank, Daniel and Laurence (1998)
- The Mighty Ducks (1992)
- Miracle (2004)
- The Monster of Phantom Lake (2006)
- Mystery Science Theater 3000: The Movie (1996)
- New in Town (2009)
- The New Land (1972)
- Normal (2025)
- North Country (2005)
- Older Than America (2008)
- One More Saturday Night (1986)
- Overnight Delivery (1998)
- The Personals (1982)
- A Prairie Home Companion (2006)
- Purple Haze (1982)
- Purple Rain (1984) (box office #1 film in the U.S.)
- Rachel River (1987)
- Rio (2011) (beginning of the film)
- A Serious Man (2009)
- Sign o' the Times (1987)
- A Simple Plan (1998)
- A Stray (2016)
- Stuart Saves His Family (1995)
- Stuck Between Stations (2011)
- Sugar & Spice (2001)
- Sweet Land (2005)
- That Was Then... This Is Now (1985)
- Thin Ice (2011)
- The Toilers and the Wayfarers (1996)
- Trauma (1993)
- Twenty Bucks (1993)
- The Unearthing (2015)
- Untamed Heart (1993)
- The Very Thought of You (1998)
- Wildfire the Arabian Heart (2010)
- Wilson (2017)
- With Honors (1994)
- Wooly Boys (2001)
- Wrongfully Accused (1998)
- You'll Like My Mother (1972)
- Young Adult (2011)

== Television ==
- Ascension (2014)
- The Bachelorette (2021)
- Beyond the Prairie: The True Story of Laura Ingalls Wilder (2000, 2002)
- The Big C (2010-2013)
- Big Time Rush (2009-2013)
- Coach (1989-1997)
- Fargo (2014–present)
- Fillmore! (2002-2004)
- Get a Life (1990-1992)
- Golan the Insatiable (2013-2015)
- Happy Town (2010)
- Laurel Avenue (1993)
- Life With Louie (1995-1998)
- Little House on the Prairie TV miniseries (2004)
- Little House on the Prairie TV series (1974-1982)
- Lucan (1977-1978)
- Mall Cops: Mall of America (2009-2010)
- The Many Loves of Dobie Gillis (1959-1963)
- The Mary Tyler Moore Show (1970-1977)
- The Mighty Ducks: Game Changers (2021–present)
- My Gym Partner's a Monkey (2005-2008)
- Mystery Science Theater 3000 (1988-1999)
- Newton's Apple (1983-1999)
- Orphan Black (2013-2017)
- 100% Freeze-Dried Minnesota (1979)
- The Adventures of Rocky and Bullwinkle and Friends (1959-1964)
- The Tom Show (1997-1998)
- Voices Within: The Lives of Truddi Chase (1990)
