= List of films set in Delft =

The following is an incomplete list of films set or shot primarily in Delft, The Netherlands.

- De Lucha Boys (2010)
- Girl with a Pearl Earring (film) (2003)
- Nosferatu the Vampyre (1979)
