= List of films set in Los Angeles =

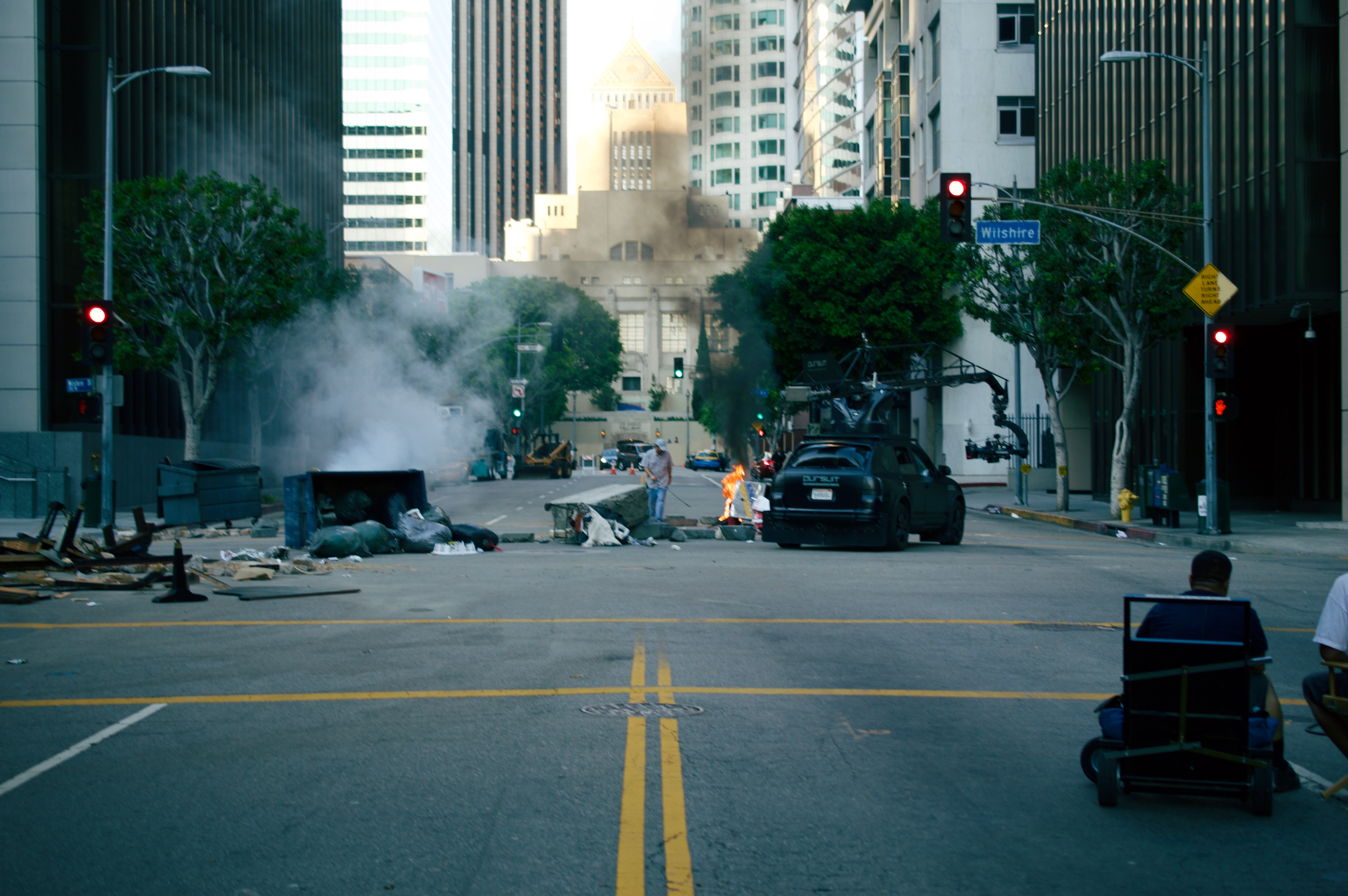
Filming a disaster scene at Wilshire and Hope in Los Angeles, California

In the history of motion pictures in the United States, many films have been set in Los Angeles, either in the Los Angeles metropolitan area or a fictionalized version thereof.

The following is a list of some of the more memorable films set in Los Angeles, however the list includes a number of films which only have a tenuous connection to the city. The list is sorted by the year the film was released.

== 1920s ==
- Souls for Sale (1923)
- Sherlock Jr. (1924)
- Show People (1928)
- The Studio Murder Mystery (1929)

== 1930s ==
- Free and Easy (1930)
- What Price Hollywood? (1932)
- Movie Crazy (1932)
- The Death Kiss (1932)
- Bombshell (1933)
- Lady Killer (1933)
- Hollywood Party (1934)
- Another Face (1935)
- A Star Is Born (1937)
- Hollywood Hotel (1937)
- Pick a Star (1937)
- It Happened in Hollywood (1937)
- Ali Baba Goes to Town (1937)
- Second Fiddle (1939)
- Hollywood Cavalcade (1939)

== 1940s ==
- Sullivan's Travels (1941)
- Hellzapoppin' (1941)
- Star Spangled Rhythm (1942)
- Double Indemnity (1944)
- Murder, My Sweet (1944)
- Hollywood Canteen (1944)
- Anchors Aweigh (1945)
- Mildred Pierce (1945)
- Abbott and Costello in Hollywood (1945)
- The Postman Always Rings Twice (1946)
- The Big Sleep (1946)
- The Jolson Story (1946)
- Fun and Fancy Free (1947)
- The Perils of Pauline (1947)
- Possessed (1947)
- Variety Girl (1947)
- He Walked by Night (1948)
- Jolson Sings Again (1949)
- White Heat (1949)
- Criss Cross (1949)

== 1950s ==
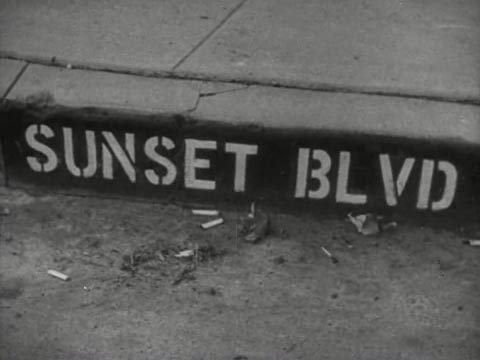
The actual painted boulevard name was used as the opening titles of the classic film-noir drama, Sunset Boulevard

- Armored Car Robbery (1950)
- Sunset Boulevard (1950)
- Valentino (1951)
- Hollywood Story (1951)
- Singin' in the Rain (1952)
- The Story of Will Rogers (1952)
- The Bad and the Beautiful (1952)
- The War of the Worlds (1953)
- A Star Is Born (1954)
- Abbott and Costello Meet the Keystone Kops (1955)
- Rebel Without a Cause (1955)
- The Buster Keaton Story (1957)
- Jeanne Eagels (1957)
- Man of a Thousand Faces (1957)
- A Bucket of Blood (1959)
- Beloved Infidel (1959)

== 1960s ==
- The Little Shop of Horrors (1960)
- Private Property (1960)
- The Exiles (1961)
- The George Raft Story (1961)
- The Parent Trap (1961 film) (1961)
- The Three Stooges in Orbit (1962)
- What Ever Happened to Baby Jane? (1962)
- Move Over, Darling (1963)
- Dead Ringer (1964)
- Muscle Beach Party (1964)
- Harlow (1965)
- The Loved One (1965)
- Dead Heat on a Merry-Go-Round (1966)
- Lord Love a Duck (1966)
- Don't Make Waves (1967)
- The Graduate (1967)
- Point Blank (1967)
- Valley of the Dolls (1967)
- Targets (1968)
- Bob & Carol & Ted & Alice (1969)
- Easy Rider (1969)
- Marlowe (1969)
- Model Shop (1969)
- They Shoot Horses, Don't They? (1969)

== 1970s ==
- Alex in Wonderland (1970)
- Beyond the Valley of the Dolls (1970)
- Halls of Anger (1970)
- Diamonds are Forever (1971)
- Escape from the Planet of the Apes (1971)
- Kotch (1971)
- Minnie and Moskowitz (1971)
- The Omega Man (1971)
- Sweet Sweetback's Baadasssss Song (1971)
- The New Centurions (1972)
- Blacula
- The Long Goodbye (1973)
- Blume in Love (1973)
- Save the Tiger (1973)
- Blazing Saddles (1974)
- Chinatown (1974)
- Earthquake (1974)
- Gone in 60 Seconds (1974)
- A Woman Under the Influence (1974)
- The Day of the Locust (1975)
- Dolemite (1975)
- Farewell, My Lovely (1975)
- Dolemite (1975)
- Night Moves (film) (1975)
- Shampoo (1975)
- Assault on Precinct 13 (1976)
- The Bad News Bears (1976)
- Car Wash (1976)
- Carrie (1976)
- Gable and Lombard (1976)
- Gus (1976)
- The Human Tornado (1976)
- Mother, Jugs & Speed (1976)
- A Star Is Born (1976)
- Trackdown (1976)
- Two-Minute Warning (1976)
- W.C. Fields and Me (1976)
- Welcome to L.A. (1976)
- Grand Theft Auto (1977)
- Petey Wheatstraw (1977)
- The Driver (1978)
- Grease (1978)
- Heaven Can Wait (1978)
- Killer of Sheep (1978)
- Straight Time (1978)
- Thank God It's Friday (1978)
- Up in Smoke (1978)
- 1941 (1979)
- Boulevard Nights (1979)
- The China Syndrome (1979)
- Disco Godfather (1979)
- Hardcore (1979)
- The Onion Field (1979)
- Roller Boogie (1979)
- Skatetown, U.S.A. (1979)
- Rock 'n' Roll High School (1979)
- Scooby Goes Hollywood (1979)

== 1980s ==
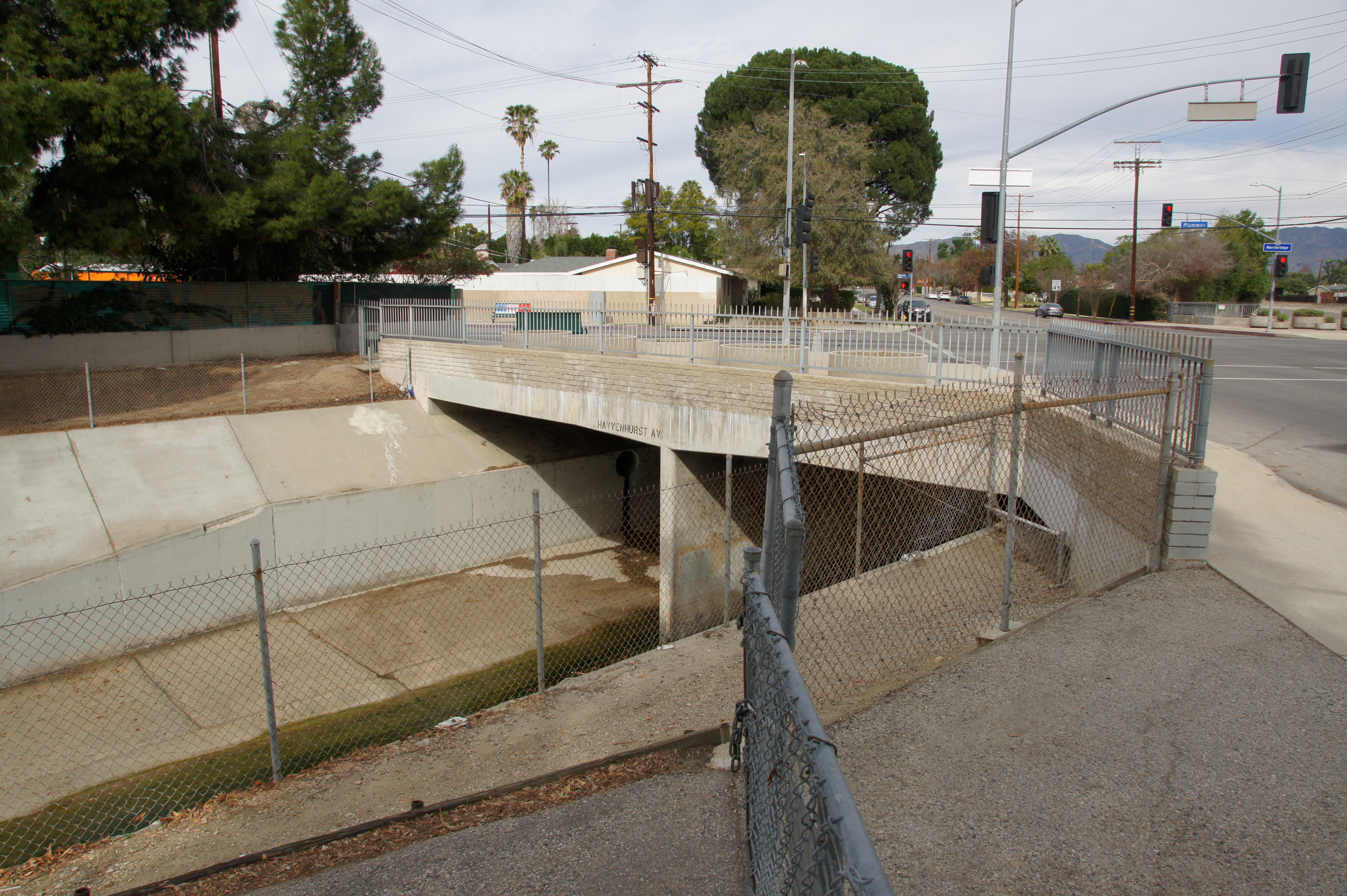
Intersection of Plummer St and Hayvenhurst Ave in San Fernando Valley, the site of the truck falling into the flood-control channel underneath in Terminator 2: Judgment Day

- 9 to 5 (1980)
- Airplane! (1980)
- Midnight Madness (1980)
- Seems Like Old Times (1980)
- Xanadu (1980)
- Carbon Copy (1981)
- The Decline of Western Civilization (1981)
- The Four Seasons (1981)
- Mommie Dearest (1981)
- S.O.B. (1981)
- True Confessions (1981)
- Zoot Suit (1981)
- Blade Runner (1982)
- E.T. the Extra-Terrestrial (1982)
- Fast Times at Ridgemont High (1982)
- Frances (1982)
- Grease 2 (1982) (local suburbs, e.g. Hawthorne)
- Partners (1982)
- The Entity (1982)
- Halloween III: Season of the Witch (1982)
- I Ought to Be in Pictures (1982)
- White Dog (1982)
- Blue Thunder (1983)
- Boardinghouse (1983)
- Mr. Mom (1983)
- The Star Chamber (1983)
- Star 80 (1983)
- Valley Girl (1983)
- Angel (1984)
- Beverly Hills Cop (1984)
- Body Double (1984)
- Crimes of Passion (1984)
- Irreconcilable Differences (1984)
- The Karate Kid (1984)
- Night of the Comet (1984)
- Protocol (1984)
- Repo Man (1984)
- Swing Shift (1984)
- The Terminator (1984)
- 8 Million Ways to Die (1985)
- Back to the Future (1985) (Universal City, California)
- Fletch (1985)
- Into the Night (1985)
- Pee-wee's Big Adventure (1985)
- To Live and Die in L.A. (1985)
- Tuff Turf (1985)
- Teen Wolf (1985)
- Down and Out in Beverly Hills (1986)
- Echo Park (1986)
- The Karate Kid Part II (1986)
- Modern Girls (1986)
- Ruthless People (1986)
- That's Life! (1986)
- Top Gun (1986)
- Barfly (1987)
- Beverly Hills Cop II (1987)
- Born in East L.A. (1987)
- Dragnet (1987)
- The Hidden (1987)
- La Bamba (1987)
- Less than Zero (1987)
- Lethal Weapon (1987)
- Maid to Order (1987)
- The Running Man (1987)
- Summer School (1987)
- Alien Nation (film) (1988)
- Big Business (1988)
- Colors (1988)
- Dead Heat (1988)
- The Decline of Western Civilization Part II: The Metal Years (1988)
- Die Hard (1988)
- Earth Girls Are Easy (1988)
- For Keeps (1988)
- License To Drive (1988)
- Miracle Mile (1988)
- The Naked Gun: From the Files of Police Squad! (1988)
- Stand and Deliver (1988)
- Sunset (1988)
- Tequila Sunrise (1988)
- They Live (1988)
- Twins (1988)
- Who Framed Roger Rabbit (1988)
- Back to the Future Part II (Universal City, California) (1989)
- Bill & Ted's Excellent Adventure (1989)
- Chances Are (1989)
- The Karate Kid Part III (1989)
- Lethal Weapon 2 (1989)
- Miracle Mile (1989)
- Skin Deep (1989)
- Tango & Cash (1989)
- Troop Beverly Hills (1989)

== 1990s ==
=== 1990 ===
- Back to the Future Part III (Universal City, California)
- Internal Affairs
- Predator 2
- Pretty Woman
- To Sleep with Anger
- The Two Jakes
- House Party (1990 film)

=== 1991 ===
- The Addams Family
- Barton Fink
- Beastmaster 2: Through the Portal of Time
- Bill & Ted's Bogus Journey
- Boyz n the Hood
- Critters 3
- The Doors
- Father of the Bride
- Grand Canyon
- The Guyver
- L.A. Story
- The Last Boy Scout
- Life Stinks
- McBain
- Night on Earth
- The People Under The Stairs
- Point Break
- The Rocketeer
- Samurai Cop
- Showdown in Little Tokyo
- Suburban Commando
- Terminator 2: Judgment Day

=== 1992 ===
- American Me
- The Bodyguard
- Buffy the Vampire Slayer
- Death Becomes Her
- Deep Cover
- Encino Man
- Lethal Weapon 3
- The Player
- Passenger 57
- Reservoir Dogs
- South Central
- Stop! Or My Mom Will Shoot
- Sunset Heat
- Where the Day Takes You
- White Men Can't Jump

=== 1993 ===
- Addams Family Values
- The Beverly Hillbillies
- Blood In Blood Out / Bound by Honor
- Falling Down
- Last Action Hero
- Menace II Society
- Mi Vida Loca
- My Girl 2
- Poetic Justice
- Rising Sun
- Rookie of the Year (select scenes)
- The Sandlot
- Short Cuts
- Sunset Grill
- True Romance

=== 1994 ===
- Airheads
- Angels in the Outfield (1994 film)
- Beverly Hills Cop III
- Clean Slate
- Clifford
- Color of Night
- Double Dragon
- Ed Wood
- The Flintstones
- Floundering
- Guyver: Dark Hero
- Jimmy Hollywood
- Leprechaun 2
- Little Giants
- The Little Rascals
- Mind Twister
- Murder Was The Case
- Naked Gun 33 1/3: The Final Insult
- The Next Karate Kid
- Pulp Fiction
- Speed
- Swimming with Sharks
- Wes Craven's New Nightmare

=== 1995 ===
- The Brady Bunch Movie
- Clueless
- Devil in a Blue Dress
- Father of the Bride Part II
- Forget Paris
- Friday
- Get Shorty
- A Goofy Movie
- Heat
- Higher Learning
- Leaving Las Vegas
- Live Nude Girls
- My Family, Mi Familia
- The Net
- Nick of Time
- Species
- Strange Days
- Tales from the Hood

=== 1996 ===
- 2 Days in the Valley
- The Craft
- The Crow: City of Angels
- Demolition Man
- Don't Be a Menace to South Central While Drinking Your Juice in the Hood
- Escape from L.A.
- Get on the Bus
- Independence Day
- Kazaam
- Last Man Standing
- Matilda
- Mulholland Falls
- Set It Off
- Spy Hard
- Swingers
- A Thin Line Between Love and Hate

=== 1997 ===
- Air Force One
- Bean
- Beverly Hills Ninja
- Boogie Nights
- Cats Don't Dance
- Face/Off
- Good Burger
- Jackie Brown
- L.A. Confidential
- Lost Highway
- Money Talks
- Nothing To Lose
- One Eight Seven
- Speed 2: Cruise Control
- Steel
- Volcano
- Quiet Days in Hollywood

=== 1998 ===
- An Alan Smithee Film: Burn Hollywood Burn
- American History X
- The Big Lebowski
- Blade
- Bulworth
- Caught Up
- City of Angels
- Gods and Monsters
- Hurlyburly
- L.A. Without a Map
- Lethal Weapon 4
- Mighty Joe Young
- A Night at the Roxbury
- The Parent Trap (1998 film)
- The Players Club
- Playing by Heart
- The Rugrats Movie
- Rush Hour
- Slums of Beverly Hills
- Twilight

=== 1999 ===
- 8mm
- Bellyfruit
- Blast from the Past
- Blue Streak
- Bowfinger
- Free Enterprise
- Go
- Hot Boyz
- Magnolia
- The Muse
- RKO 281
- South Park: Bigger, Longer & Uncut (select scenes)
- Sugar Town
- The Thirteenth Floor
- The Wood

== 2000s ==
=== 2000 ===
- 3 Strikes
- The Anniversary Party
- Big Momma's House
- Bread and Roses
- Brother
- Charlie's Angels
- Disney's The Kid
- The Flintstones in Viva Rock Vegas
- Gone in 60 Seconds
- Hanging Up
- Hellraiser: Inferno
- Leprechaun in the Hood
- Lost Souls
- Love & Basketball
- Next Friday
- Rugrats in Paris: The Movie
- Scream 3
- The Three Stooges
- Traffic
- Welcome to Hollywood
- What's Cooking?

=== 2001 ===
- The Anniversary Party
- Baby Boy
- Bandits
- Blow
- The Cat's Meow
- Crazy/Beautiful
- Crocodile Dundee in Los Angeles
- Dogtown and Z-Boys
- The Fast and the Furious
- Jay and Silent Bob Strike Back
- Joe Dirt
- Made
- Max Keeble's Big Move
- Mulholland Drive
- Rush Hour 2
- Southlander
- Swordfish
- Training Day
- The Wash

=== 2002 ===
- Adaptation
- Austin Powers in Goldmember
- Big Fat Liar
- Black Knight
- Catch Me If You Can
- Collateral Damage
- Crossroads
- Dark Blue
- Enough
- Friday After Next
- Laurel Canyon
- Like Mike
- Nothing So Strange
- Punch-Drunk Love
- Real Women Have Curves
- The Salton Sea
- Showtime
- XXX

=== 2003 ===
- And Starring Pancho Villa as Himself
- Baadasssss!
- Biker Boyz
- Charlie's Angels: Full Throttle
- Confidence
- The Core
- Cradle 2 the Grave
- Freaky Friday
- Holes
- Hollywood Homicide
- Hulk
- Kill Bill: Volume 1
- The Italian Job
- Leprechaun: Back 2 tha Hood
- Los Angeles Plays Itself
- Malibu's Most Wanted
- A Man Apart
- Matchstick Men
- National Security
- Rugrats Go Wild
- Stuck on You
- S.W.A.T.
- Terminator 3: Rise of the Machines
- Thirteen
- Wonderland

=== 2004 ===
- The Aviator
- Bride & Prejudice
- Cellular
- A Cinderella Story
- Collateral
- The Day After Tomorrow
- Ray
- Sideways
- Seed of Chucky
- Soul Plane
- Starsky & Hutch
- Superbabies: Baby Geniuses 2
- Toolbox Murders

=== 2005 ===
- The 40-Year-Old Virgin
- Be Cool
- Bewitched
- Black Dawn
- Boss'n Up
- Constantine
- Crash
- Cursed
- Dirty
- Goal!
- Happy Endings
- Hard Candy
- Harsh Times
- Havoc
- Herbie: Fully Loaded
- The Island
- Kiss Kiss Bang Bang
- Lords of Dogtown
- Monster-in-Law
- The Sandlot 2
- Shopgirl
- Torque
- XXX: State of the Union

=== 2006 ===
- 10.5: Apocalypse
- Akeelah and the Bee
- Alpha Dog
- Belly 2: Millionaire Boyz Club
- Big Momma's House 2
- The Black Dahlia
- Bobby
- Bring It On: All or Nothing
- Cars
- Click
- Crank
- Dreamgirls
- Friends with Money
- Gridiron Gang
- Harsh Times
- The Holiday
- Hollywoodland
- Inland Empire
- Jackass Number Two
- Little Miss Sunshine
- Man About Town
- Nearing Grace
- Quinceañera
- Snakes on a Plane
- Stan
- Waist Deep
- X-Men: The Last Stand

=== 2007 ===
- 1408
- Alvin and The Chipmunks
- Bratz: The Movie
- Dragon Wars
- Fracture
- Freedom Writers
- The Hammer
- Invasion of the Pod People
- Knocked Up
- Nancy Drew
- Pandemic
- Rush Hour 3
- The Sandlot: Heading Home
- Smiley Face
- Southland Tales
- There Will Be Blood
- Transformers
- Urban Justice

=== 2008 ===
- Ace of Hearts
- Another Cinderella Story
- Bedtime Stories
- Beverly Hills Chihuahua
- Bolt
- Changeling
- Drillbit Taylor
- Eagle Eye
- The Eye
- Forgetting Sarah Marshall
- Garden Party
- Get Smart
- Hancock
- The Informers
- Iron Man
- Lakeview Terrace
- The Love Guru
- Quarantine
- Role Models
- Street Kings
- Sunday School Musical
- The Take
- Taken
- War of the Worlds 2: The Next Wave
- Yu-Gi-Oh! 5D's (2008)

=== 2009 ===
- 17 Again
- 2012
- 2012: Supernova
- 500 Days of Summer
- All About Steve
- Alvin and the Chipmunks: The Squeakquel
- Black Dynamite
- Blood and Bone
- Crank: High Voltage
- Crossing Over
- Drag Me to Hell
- Fast & Furious
- Funny People
- G-Force
- I Love You, Man
- The Informers
- Land of the Lost
- My Sister's Keeper
- Notorious
- Obsessed
- A Single Man
- The Soloist
- Spread
- Street Fighter: The Legend of Chun-Li
- Terminator Salvation
- Transformers: Revenge of the Fallen
- Totally Spies! The Movie
- The Ugly Truth
- Zombieland

== 2010s ==
=== 2010 ===
- 30 Days of Night: Dark Days
- The A-Team
- Beginners
- Cats & Dogs: The Revenge of Kitty Galore
- Cyrus
- Get Him to the Greek
- Greenberg
- Horrorween
- Inception
- Iron Man 2
- Jackass 3D
- The Kids Are All Right
- Kites
- The Losers
- Mega Shark Versus Crocosaurus
- My Name is Khan
- Resident Evil: Afterlife
- The Runaways
- Skyline
- Takers
- Tooth Fairy
- Tron: Legacy
- Valentine's Day
- Yu-Gi-Oh!: Bonds Beyond Time

=== 2011 ===
- The Artist
- Battle: Los Angeles
- Battle of Los Angeles
- Beverly Hills Chihuahua 2
- Big Mommas: Like Father, Like Son
- Born to Be a Star
- Cars 2
- Crazy, Stupid, Love
- Cross
- Drive
- Fast Five
- Friends with Benefits
- From Prada to Nada
- Ghost Shark 2: Urban Jaws
- Girl Walks into a Bar
- The Green Hornet
- Green Lantern
- The Hit List
- Hop
- Horrible Bosses
- In Time
- Insidious
- Jack and Jill
- Just Go with It
- Larry Crowne
- Like Crazy
- The Lincoln Lawyer
- The Muppets
- No Strings Attached
- The Pool Boys
- Princess and the Pony
- S.W.A.T.: Firefight
- Transformers: Dark of the Moon

=== 2012 ===
- Argo
- Caroline and Jackie
- Celeste and Jesse Forever
- End of Watch
- The Guest House
- Hitchcock
- Project X
- Seven Psychopaths
- Sound of My Voice
- Taken 2

=== 2013 ===
- Age of Dinosaurs
- Bad Words
- The Bling Ring
- The Call
- The Canyons
- Fast & Furious 6
- Gangster Squad
- Her
- Whiplash (2014 film)
- Iron Man 3
- The Purge
- Saving Mr. Banks
- Big Ass Spider!
- This Is the End

=== 2014 ===
- 10.0 Earthquake
- Alex of Venice
- Android Cop
- Bhopal: A Prayer for Rain
- Cake
- Chef
- Echo Park
- Girltrash: All Night Long
- The Gambler
- Horrible Bosses 2
- Inherent Vice
- Let's Be Cops
- Starry Eyes
- Step Up: All In
- Taken 3
- The Liquid Psychologist
- Million Dollar Arm
- Nightcrawler
- The Purge: Anarchy
- Walk of Shame
- Welcome to Me
- Wish I Was Here

=== 2015 ===
- Being Charlie
- Blackhat
- Day Out of Days
- Dope
- Entourage
- Fire Twister
- French Dirty
- Furious 7
- Get Hard
- The Gift
- Hollywood Adventures
- L.A. Slasher
- Lavalantula
- The Overnight
- San Andreas
- Straight Outta Compton
- Tangerine
- Terminator Genisys
- Too Late
- Trumbo
- We Are Your Friends
- Weepah Way For Now
- Woman in Gold

=== 2016 ===
- Amateur Night
- Café Society
- Girl Flu
- Hail, Caesar!
- Keanu
- Knight of Cups
- La La Land
- Namour
- The Neon Demon
- The Nice Guys
- No Light and No Land Anywhere
- Nobody Walks in L.A.
- Nocturnal Animals
- Patriots Day
- Rules Don't Apply
- Pocket Listing
- Sensitivity Training

=== 2017 ===
- All Eyez on Me
- Axis
- Baywatch
- Blade Runner 2049
- Bright
- Cars 3
- CHiPs
- The Disaster Artist
- The Hero
- Ingrid Goes West
- It Happened in L.A.
- Kings
- Molly's Game
- Once Upon a Time in Venice
- Roman J. Israel, Esq.
- Shot Caller
- The Tribes of Palos Verdes
- Unforgettable

=== 2018 ===
- A Star Is Born
- Den of Thieves
- Destroyer
- Followed
- The Happytime Murders
- Peppermint
- Poor Greg Drowning
- Billionaire Boys Club
- The Kissing Booth
- Mid90s
- Electric Love
- Under The Silver Lake

=== 2019 ===
- 1BR
- Acceleration
- Booksmart
- Captain Marvel
- The Drone
- The Fanatic
- Ford v Ferrari
- Madness in the Method
- Once Upon a Time in Hollywood
- Rocketman
- Spies in Disguise
- Stuber
- Yesterday

== 2020s ==
=== 2020 ===
- The Banker
- Birds of Prey
- Kajillionaire
- Like a Boss
- Onward
- Scoob!
- Songbird
- The Tax Collector
- Tenet
- The Way Back

=== 2021 ===
- Bliss
- Dear Evan Hansen
- F9
- The Forever Purge
- Free Guy
- Licorice Pizza
- The Little Things
- Mortal Kombat
- Space Jam: A New Legacy
- How It Ends

=== 2022 ===
- Ambulance
- Babylon
- The Bad Guys
- Blonde
- Bullet Train
- Day Shift
- Doctor Strange in the Multiverse of Madness
- Don't Worry Darling
- Everything Everywhere All at Once
- The Fabelmans
- Jackass Forever
- Moonfall
- Nope
- Scream
- Top Gun: Maverick
- The Unbearable Weight of Massive Talent

=== 2023 ===
- 80 for Brady
- Air
- Aquaman and the Lost Kingdom
- Barbie
- Creed III
- Evil Dead Rise
- Fast X
- House Party
- M3GAN
- Missing
- Oppenheimer
- Poolman
- Transformers: Rise of the Beasts

=== 2024 ===
- Beverly Hills Cop: Axel F
- Goodrich
- Lights Out
- MaXXXine
- Mother of the Bride
- Night Swim
- Poolman
- The Substance
- Thelma

=== 2025 ===
- Borderline
- Freakier Friday
- Jimmy and Stiggs
- Karate Kid: Legends
- One of Them Days
- The Bad Guys 2

=== 2026 ===
- Goat
- Jackass: Best and Last
- Mercy
- Michael
- Minions & Monsters
- The Wrong Girls

== Los Angeles destroyed in films ==
- The War of the Worlds (1953) (destroyed by an alien invasion)
- Earthquake (1974) (destroyed by an earthquake)
- Night of the Comet (1984) (destroyed by a comet)
- The Terminator (1984) (destroyed by artificially intelligent machines)
- The Great Los Angeles Earthquake (1990) (destroyed by an earthquake)
- Terminator 2: Judgment Day (1991) (destroyed by a nuclear bomb)
- Double Dragon (1994) (destroyed by a major earthquake in 2007)
- Escape from L.A. (1996) (destroyed by a major earthquake and tsunami in 2000)
- Independence Day (1996) (destroyed by an alien invasion)
- Volcano (1997) (destroyed by a large volcanic eruption)
- Tycus (2000) (destroyed by a piece of the Moon after being hit by comet Tycus)
- Terminator 3: Rise of the Machines (2003) (destroyed by a nuclear bomb)
- The Day After Tomorrow (2004) (destroyed by a series of massive tornadoes)
- 10.5: Apocalypse (2006) (destroyed by an earthquake)
- Dragon Wars (2007) (destroyed by a giant monster attack)
- Pandemic (2007) (destroyed by a bird flu outbreak)
- Transformers (2007) (destroyed by a series of giant robots)
- Life After People (2008) (disintegration)
- War of the Worlds 2: The Next Wave (2008) (destroyed by an alien invasion)
- Terminator Salvation (2009) (destroyed by artificially intelligent machines)
- 2012 (2009) (destroyed by a massive earthquake)
- 2012: Supernova (2009) (destroyed by a supernova)
- Zombieland (2009) (destroyed by a zombie apocalypse)
- Resident Evil: Afterlife (2010) (destroyed by an epidemic)
- Skyline (2010) (destroyed by an alien invasion)
- Battle: Los Angeles (2011) (destroyed by an alien invasion)
- Disaster Wars: Earthquake vs. Tsunami (2013) (destroyed by a tsunami)
- This Is the End (2013) (destroyed by the Rapture)
- 10.0 Earthquake (2014) (destroyed by a massive earthquake)
- Fire Twister (2015) (destroyed by a fire tornado)
- L.A. Apocalypse (2015) (annihilation of the city due to an explosion)
- San Andreas (2015) (destroyed by a massive earthquake)
- Terminator Genisys (2015) (destroyed by a nuclear bomb)
- Destruction: Los Angeles (2017) (destroyed by a massive earthquake)
- Eruption LA (2018) (destroyed by a volcanic eruption)
- "Moonfall" (2022) (destroyed by the Moon)

== Anime ==
- Pet Shop of Horrors (1999)
- Death Note (2006-2007)
- Heroman (2010)
- Harukana Receive (2018)
- Mutafukaz (2018)

== Los Angeles Set in Animation ==
- A Goofy Movie (1995)
- Cats Don't Dance (1997)
- Space Chimps (2008)
- Monsters vs. Aliens (2009)
- Despicable Me (2010)
- Trigun: Badlands Rumble (2010)
- Rio (2011)
- The Adventures of Tintin (film) (2011)
- Puss in Boots (2011)
- Brave (2012)
- Despicable Me 2 (2013)
- Rio 2 (2014)
- The Anthem of Heart (2015)
- The Good Dinosaur (2015)
- Throne of Elves (2016)
- Moana (2016)
- Ice Age: Collision Course (2016)
- The Angry Birds Movie (2016)
- Gantz: O (2016)
- Despicable Me 3 (2017)
- Coco (2017)
- Cars 3 (2017)
- The Grinch (2018)
- The Stolen Princess (2018)
- Smallfoot (2018)
- The Angry Birds Movie 2 (2019)
- Mortal Kombat Legends: Cage Match (2023)

== See also ==
- List of television shows set in Los Angeles
- Lists of films based on location
- Los Angeles Plays Itself (2003), a documentary about the representation of Los Angeles on film
