= List of films shot in Iceland =

This is a list of foreign films shot in Iceland.

== List ==
Film	Year	Locations	References
Aadhavan	2010	Blue Lagoon, Skógafoss, Jökulsárlón, Reykjavík, Reynisdrangar, Seljalandsfoss	
A View to a Kill	1985	Jökulsárlón	
Running Blind	1979	Reykjavík, Sprengisandur	
Batman Begins	2005	Vatnajökull	
Beowulf & Grendel	2005	Skógafoss and elsewhere	
Bokeh	2017	Reykjavík, as well as unidentified "waterfalls, glaciers, springs, caves and cliffs."	
Choosoddaam Randi	2000	Jökulsárlón, Reynisdrangar	
Crocodile (Black Mirror)	2017	Unnamed locations	
Die Another Day	2002	Jökulsárlón	
Dilwale	2015	Southern Region (Iceland): Sólheimasandur, Skógafoss, Reynisdrangar, Seljalandsfoss, Stokksnes, Jökulsárlón, Fjallsárlón	
Eurovision Song Contest: The Story of Fire Saga	2020	Húsavík	
Fast & Furious 8	2017	Mývatn	
Faust	2011		
Flags of Our Fathers	2006	Sandvík	
Hostel: Part II	2007	Blue Lagoon	
Interstellar	2014	Svínafellsjökull	
Journey to the Center of the Earth	2008	Snæfellsjökull	
Judge Dredd	1995		
Land Ho!	2014		
Lara Croft: Tomb Raider	2001	Jökulsárlón	
Letters from Iwo Jima	2006		
Noah	2014	Hafursey	
Hanuman.com	2013		
Naayak	2013	Ljótipollur, Reynisdrangar, Blue Lagoon, Jökulsárlón	
Namo Venkatesa	2010	Jökulsárlón, Skógafoss, Reynisdrangar, Seljalandsfoss	
Nova Zembla	2011		
Oblivion	2013		
Prometheus	2012	Hekla, Dettifoss, Vatnajökull National Park	
Sons of the Soil	1920		
Star Trek Into Darkness	2013		
Star Wars: The Force Awakens	2015		
Stardust	2007		
The Secret Life of Walter Mitty	2013		
Thor: The Dark World	2013	Skógafoss	
True Love (Once Removed)	2002		
When the Light Comes	1998		
Dead Snow: Red vs. Dead	2014		
Rogue One: A Star Wars Story	2016	Hafursey, Hjörleifshöfði, Krafla and Lake Mývatn	
Through Night and Day	2018	Locale near Route 1	
The Midnight Sky	2020	Vatnajökull National Park	
