= Ingvild =

Ingvild is a given name. Notable people with the name include:

- Ingvild Aleksandersen, Norwegian county governor
- Ingvild Almås, Norwegian economics professor
- Ingvild Bakkerud (born 1995), Norwegian handball player
- Ingvild Bryn (born 1961), Norwegian journalist
- Ingvild Ryggen Carstens (born 1980), Norwegian ski mountaineer and former heptathlete
- Ingvild Deila (born 1987), Norwegian actress
- Ingvild Gåskjenn (born 1998), Norwegian cyclist
- Ingvild Helljesen (born 1971), Norwegian journalist
- Ingvild Isaksen (born 1989), Norwegian footballer
- Ingvild Kjerkol (born 1975), Norwegian politician for the Labour Party
- Ingvild Vaggen Malvik (born 1971), Norwegian politician for the Socialist Left Party
- Ingvild Flugstad Østberg (born 1990), Norwegian cross-country skier
- Ingvild H. Rishøi (born 1978), Norwegian journalist
- Ingvild Snildal (born 1988), Olympic and National Record holding swimmer from Norway
- Ingvild Stensland (born 1981), Norwegian football player
- Ingvild Tautra Vevatne (born 1950), Norwegian politician for the Liberal Party
- Ingvild Wetrhus Thorsvik (born 1991), Norwegian politician for the Liberal Party

== See also ==
- Ingvill
