= Vevatne =

Vevatne is a Norwegian surname. Notable people with the surname include:

- Jan M. Vevatne (born 1950), Norwegian politician
- Viljar Vevatne (born 1994), Norwegian footballer
