= Guardians of the Whills =

Faction in Star Wars

- Star Wars organization
- Cover for the original edition of Star Wars: Guardians of the Whills (2017)

In-universe information
- Type: Monastic
- Location: Jedha
- Key people: Chirrut Îmwe; Baze Malbus (formerly)
- Official language: Basic

The Guardians of the Whills are a faction in the fictional universe of the Star Wars franchise. The Guardians are depicted as an organization of ascetics who revere the Force, a metaphysical entity in the Star Wars fictional universe, though unlike the Jedi or the Sith, they do not appear to wield overtly supernatural powers derived from their connection to the Force.

The term Whills originated from unused in-universe elements and story treatments by series creator George Lucas for the franchise's film series, most notably the Journal of the Whills, Part I (Lucas's earliest known draft for the first film). Following the acquisition of Lucas' company Lucasfilm, Ltd. and the Star Wars intellectual property by The Walt Disney Company in 2012, the term is repurposed and reintroduced as the Guardians of the Whills, an esoteric monastic order who protect visiting pilgrims to a sacred temple located in the planet Jedha. A blind Guardian named Chirrut Îmwe and his companion Baze Malbus appear as supporting characters in the 2016 film Rogue One, they aid members of the Rebel Alliance to steal plans of the Death Star, the ultimate weapon of the Galactic Empire. Chirrut Îmwe and Baze Malbus are portrayed by Donnie Yen and Jiang Wen respectively. Members of the monastic order have appeared in other Star Wars media, in particular the 2017 eponymous tie-in novel to Rogue One which featured appearances by Chirrut and Baze.

Both Chirrut and Baze have received a positive reception, and have since been recognized as fan favorites and influential characters in their own right.

== Development ==
"Originally, I was trying to have the story be told by somebody else (an immortal being known as a Whill); there was somebody watching this whole story and recording it, somebody probably wiser than the mortal players in the actual events. I eventually dropped this idea, and the concepts behind the Whills turned into the Force. But the Whills became part of this massive amount of notes, quotes, background information that I used for the scripts; the stories were actually taken from the Journal of the Whills."

— George Lucas, Star Wars: The Annotated Screenplays

The Whills was originally a vague reference to an omnipresent yet distant order which was meant to be the narrative framing in an early draft of the Star Wars saga by George Lucas. Lucas also came up with the Journal of the Whills as a concept of "Bible-like texts that inspire the stories chronicled in the Star Wars movies", essentially serving as a plot device that connects the fictional universe he created to the real world. Before he sold the Star Wars media franchise to Disney, Lucas had considered developing a potential film trilogy of sequels to the original Trilogy where it would have explored a microbiotic world populated by creatures called Whills, which feed off the Force and are capable of using that connection to manipulate the universe. Lucas thought of the franchise's Force-sensitive characters as "vehicles for the Whills to travel around in", with the conduit being the controversial midi-chlorian concept introduced in the prequel trilogy. Since the Whills are the entities that communicate with the midi-chlorians, Lucas was of the opinion that "in a general sense, they are the Force". In the AMC series James Cameron's Story of Science Fiction, Lucas revealed that he had considered this story treatment to be the proper conclusion to the narrative arc which commenced with the original trilogy and followed by the prequel trilogy, but cited the divisive reception of the prequel trilogy and acknowledged that it would have proven controversial with fans.

While the Whills were briefly mentioned in the script and novelization of Episode 3, they did not make an appearance until the 2016 film Rogue One: A Star Wars Story. Screenwriter Chris Weitz drew from Lucas' original ideas about the Whills while also departing from them to create the Guardians of the Whills faction, a religious order which is responsible for protecting an ancient Jedi temple on the planet Jedha prior to its sacking by Imperial forces. According to lore presented in the Rogue One Visual Guide, as well as a quote from the Journal of the Whills which serves as an opening to the official novelization of The Force Awakens, the Guardians' teachings do not appear to emphasize a discord between the light and dark sides of the Force, and instead take a position of neutrality with a focus on encompassing the totality of its aspects as well as reverence for the "balance of the Force". In a Rogue One "Watch From Home Theater" program hosted by IGN, Weitz noted that Lucas originally called the Force, "The Force of Others". The term was frequently used by Chirrut Îmwe, a Guardian of the Whills who appears in the film as a representative character of the monastic organization, in early treatments of the film's script by Weitz. Although the character is blind and unable to use the Force like the Jedi, he is devoted to the Force and could sense its presence. Chirrut's skill in martial arts can rival that of a lightsaber-wielding Jedi; he is capable of defeating an entire squad of stormtroopers single-handedly, and even shoot down a TIE fighter using a specialized crossbow-shaped energy weapon called a "lightbow".

Weitz noted that the Star Wars franchise has had a long history of presenting compelling dual pairings between characters whose outlooks and personalities are the opposites of each other. Chirrut and his companion, Baze Malbus, a former Guardian who left the organization prior to the events of Rogue One, were conceived during the initial design stage as a "dyad" who "don't belong together, but they do": the former, "a believer in the Force", and the latter, a "militaristic soldier". To Weitz, Chirrut is Baze's confessor, which enables the latter to lay his own guilt onto Chirrut even though he is a faithless warrior who does not believe in the Force, and Chirrut could believe in his friend's eventual redemption. The character designs for Chirrut and Baze went through numerous iterations during the development of the film, with up to 30 different variations. The entirety of Chirrut's face, except for his eyes, was initially covered, and Baze was originally a four-armed alien before he is made human. The attires for both Chirrut and Baze had a militaristic style, with a more armored and weaponized look.

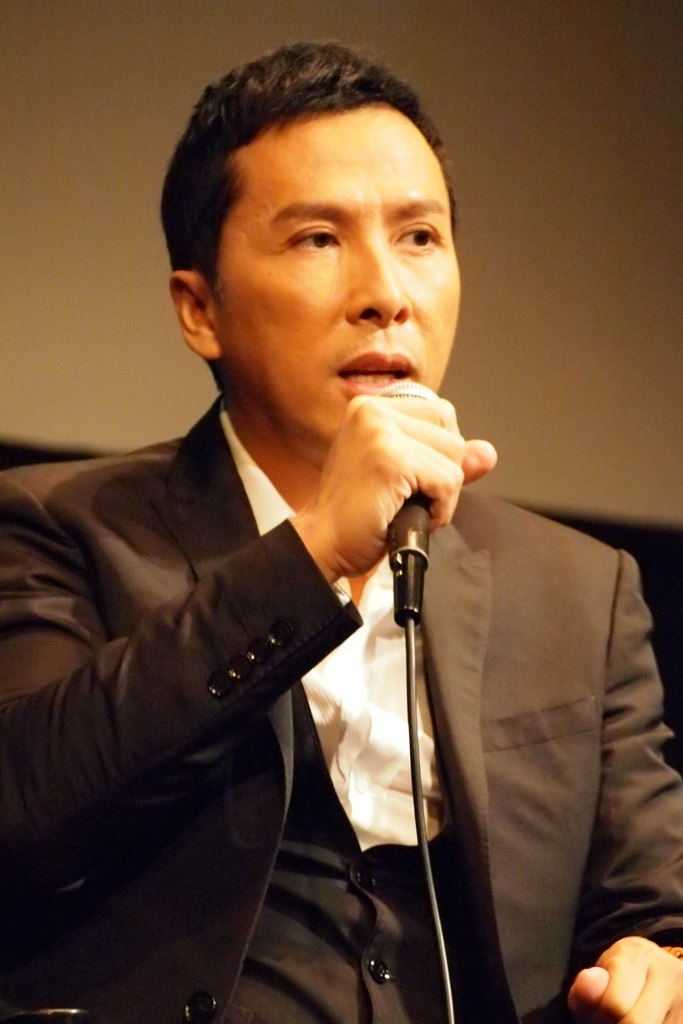
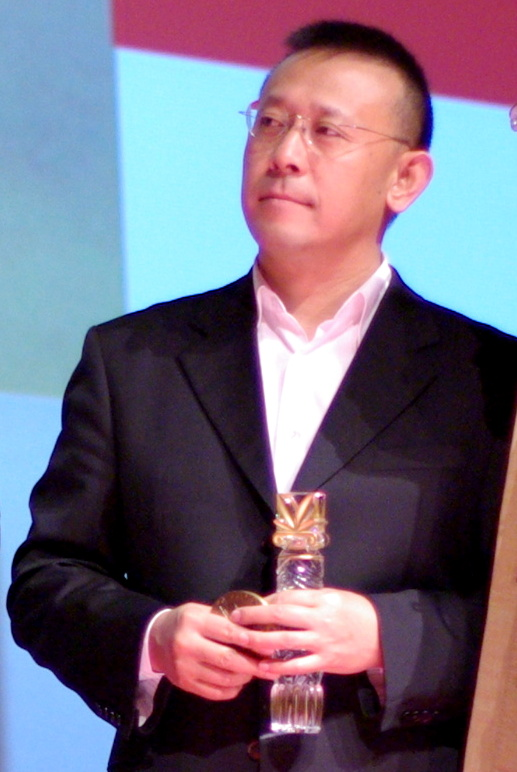
Donnie Yen (left) and Jiang Wen (right) portrayed Chirrut Îmwe and Baze Malbus, respectively.

Once Hong Kong actor Donnie Yen's casting as Chirrut was confirmed, the film's concept artists began looking to Yen's particular style, and his body of martial arts films, for inspiration, which led to the removal of armor and armaments from Chirrut's design in favor of a sleeker look. Yen was originally reluctant to accept the part as he did not want to be away from his family for an extended period of time, as he was required to relocate to the United Kingdom for five months of filming. Yen accepted the role on his son's urging, but insisted on having creative input in the character's development process as a condition of his acceptance. Yen did not want his character to be stereotyped as "another Chinese kung fu master", and wanted Chirrut to have a sense of humour, as per his view that children need to think of the character as being "cool". Yen proposed that the character be made blind, and did research on the exact blue shade of color he wanted for Chirrut's atrophied eyes.

Baze Malbus was named after Weitz's half-elven Dungeons & Dragons player character from his childhood years. Designer David Crossman described Baze as a combination of several well-loved elements from fan favorite Star Wars characters, and that his visual design is driven by what they thought audiences would like to see in a mercenary character, highlighting in particular "the partial armor, the boiler suit, the cool gun, the backpack". Baze's signature weapon, a heavy repeating blaster cannon, was designed by artists Jamie Wilkinson and Adam Brockbank early in the film development. The red color theme on Baze's character design was eventually incorporated into Chirrut's vestments as a canonical religious aspect, which links both characters thematically. Chinese actor Jiang Wen was originally uncertain about accepting the role, as he felt that his proficiency in English was lacking and he had difficulty reading the script; he was assisted by his eldest son who could fluently read English and interpret the script, and decided to travel to London after being encouraged by his children.

== Appearances ==
=== Rogue One ===
Chirrut first appears on the streets of Jedha City preaching about the Force, where he encounters Jyn Erso and Cassian Andor. After sensing that Jyn's necklace is made of Kyber crystal, the same material that power lightsabers, he asks her if she knew what they were. He later comes to her aid after a plot to disguise herself and her companions was foiled by Imperial forces, as Jedha City is caught up in a conflict between Partisan insurgents, led by Saw Gerrera, and Imperial forces who are looting the Guardians' Temple of the Kyber for Kyber crystals. Using his highly honed senses to determine the positions of approaching Imperial troopers, as well as a timely assist by Baze Malbus, he defeated them in quick succession. Chirrut, Baze, Jyn, and Cassian are then abducted by Partisan forces and herded into confinement cells. Along with Imperial defector Bodhi Rook, the group would eventually make their escape from the Partisan base aboard a U-Wing as Jedha City is attacked and destroyed by the Empire's new superweapon, the Death Star.

With the remnants of the temple the Guardians are sworn to protect obliterated, Chirrut and Baze remain with Jyn's group and accompany them to the Imperial world of Eadu in search for Jyn's father Galen, who originally designed the Death Star under duress. Chirrut warns Jyn about Cassian's possible murderous intent towards Galen, as he had sensed the Force flowing darkly about him. Chirrut and Baze help the Rebels fight off Imperial forces, before departing on a stolen shuttle to Yavin IV. After the Rebel Alliance declines Jyn's request to send a fleet to the world of Scarif, Chirrut and Baze join her mission to break into the Imperial archives to secure the plans for the Death Star, and are put in charge of an assault team that would set charges to lure out Imperial Stormtroopers. Both Chirrut and Baze subsequently hold the line in order to extend time for their allies to complete their tasks; Chirrut dies in an explosion after flipping a switch to broadcast the Death Star plans to the Rebels via a signal, while Baze sacrifices himself to help deactivate the planetary deflector shield which blocks the signal.

=== In other media ===
Chirrut and Baze appear as the main characters of the 2017 prequel tie-in novel to Rogue One, Star Wars: Guardians of the Whills, which explores their backstories, as well as their past interactions with Saw Gerrera. A manga adaptation of the novel by Viz Media is set for release on 4 May 2021.

Several Guardians appear in a flashback retelling by recurring Star Wars Rebels character Hondo Ohnaka in the 2019 tie-in comic book miniseries to the theme park attraction Star Wars: Galaxy's Edge. Set prior to the events of Rogue One, the Guardians intercept him and his client in a "sacred tunnel" passageway and attempt to stop them from trespassing into the Temple of the Kyber.

== Reception ==
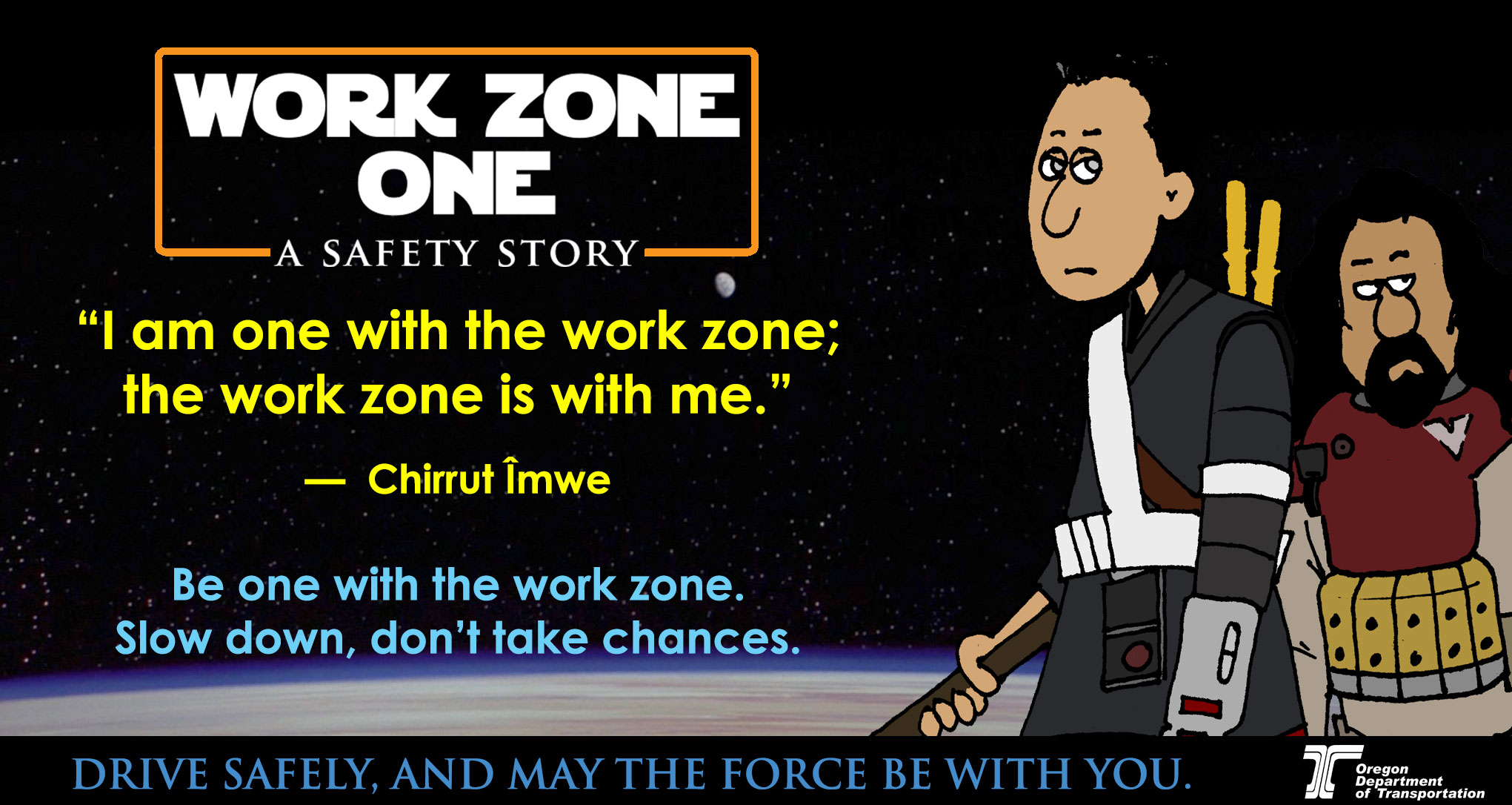
A parody image created by the Oregon Department of Transportation to promote awareness of work zone safety, which references Chirrut's mantra about the Force

Chirrut and Baze, the two most prominent representatives of the faction within series continuity, have received a positive reception from professional reviewers and are recognized as fan favorite characters by Star Wars fans. Chirrut in particular was singled out for praise as having the best quotable dialogue in Rogue One. Julian Medranda from The Highlander said Chirrut and Baze were the characters he found the most compelling; he compared their chemistry to Han Solo and Chewbacca, and found almost every interaction involving them to be enjoyable even though they were essentially minor characters whose interesting scenes were often interrupted by "boring" action set pieces or lengthy exposition scenes. Medranda suggested that, while the casting of Yen and Jiang could be interpreted as a marketing ploy to appeal to Chinese audiences, their inclusion packed charm which the main cast supposedly lacked. In her review of the Guardians of the Whills novel, Amy Ratcliffe from Nerdist appreciated the duo's grounded characterization – Chirrut's sense of hope and Baze's inner conflict – and the fact that they accept that they are not fully in control of their situation following the Empire's disruption of their lives. Ratcliffe praised their devotion, persistence, friendship and their willingness to fight for the innocent people of Jedha.

In an article written for Screen Rant, where he commented on the Guardians' appearance in Galaxy's Edge, Andrew Dyce expressed hope that the order as a whole have managed to survive the Imperial invasion and replenish their numbers, and that Guardian characters would continue to appear in future Star Wars stories. Similarly, Jesse Schedeen from IGN was hopeful that Disney would revisit "the glory days of Jedha and the Guardians of the Whills" via a television series set before Rogue One. Leon Hurley from Gamesradar wanted to see a spin-off movie featuring either Chirrut and Baze in the style of a buddy film, or a narrative that is centered on the Guardians of the Whills as a whole.

Chirrut and Baze appeared as a popular pairing in several "shipping" related posts and opinion pieces by critics and fans, particularly during December 2016, which was the month Rogue One was released.

=== In popular culture ===
- In September 2017, the animated web series How It Should Have Ended ("HISHE") released a brickfilm parody video made using stop motion filmmaking techniques which greatly exaggerates Chirrut's combat prowess.
- Artist Dan Mumford created a poster depicting Chirrut and Baze titled "I Am One with the Force, The Force Is With Me", which references Chirrut's mantra.
- In an interview with Malaysian publication The Star, author Zen Cho credited the "odd couple" dynamic between Chirrut and Baze as an inspiration for her 2020 wuxia fiction novel, The Order of the Pure Moon Reflected in Water.
