= Ingvill =

Ingvill is a given name. Notable people with the name include:

- Ingvill Måkestad Bovim (born 1981), Norwegian track and field athlete
- Ingvill Raaum (1935–2012), Norwegian politician

== See also ==
- Ingvild
