= Hafursey =

Mountain in southern Iceland

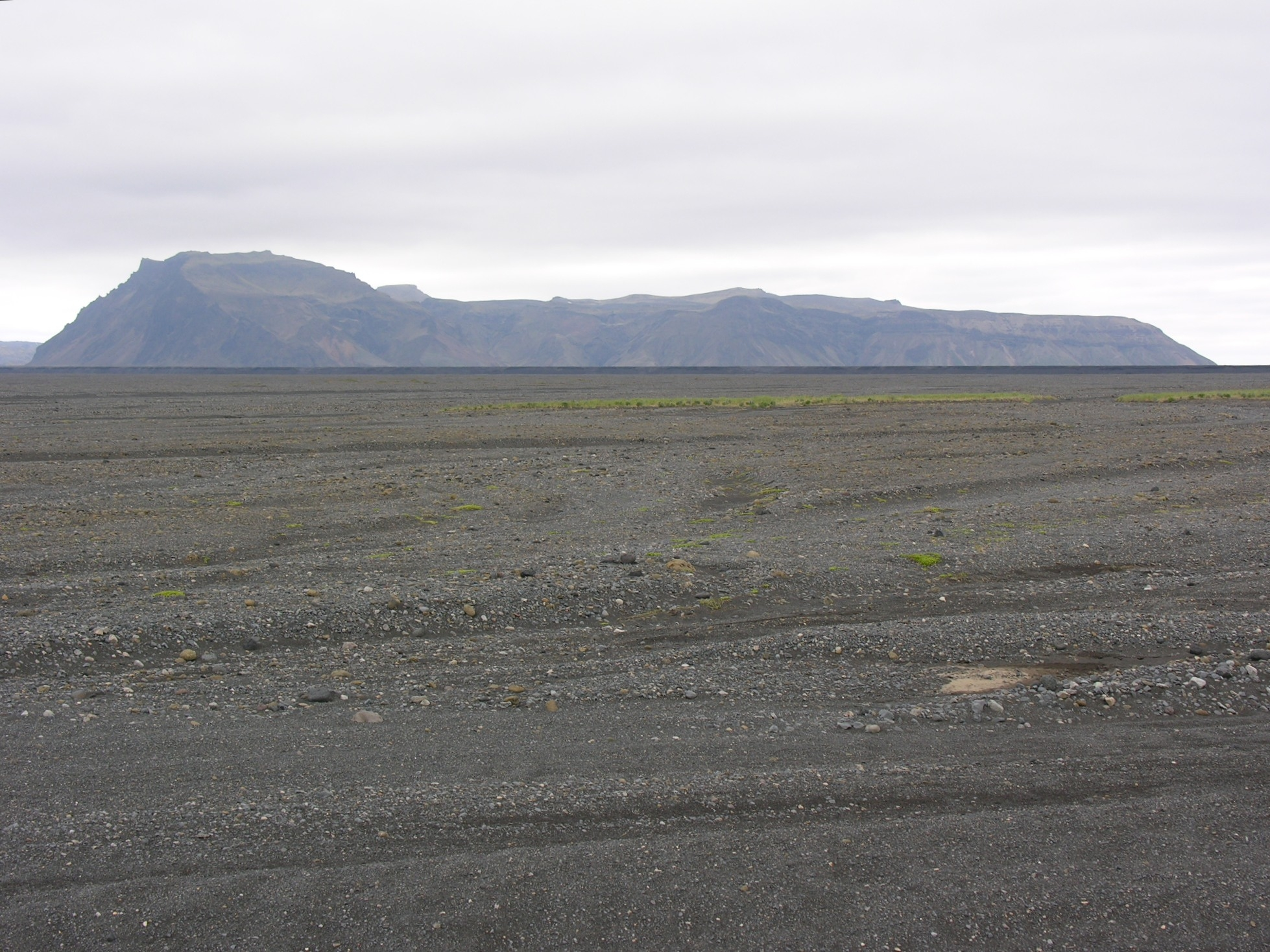
- Hafursey seen from Route 1

Highest point
- Elevation: 582 m (1,909 ft)
- Coordinates: 63°31′00″N 18°48′00″W

Geography
- Location within Iceland
- Location: Vestur-Skaftafellssýsla, Southern Region, Iceland

Geology
- Mountain type: Inselberg

Hafursey (Icelandic pronunciation: [ˈhaːvʏr̥sˌeiː]; 582 m (1,909 ft)) is an inselberg in Southern Iceland. It has a length of 4.8 km (3.0 mi) and a width of 3 km (1.9 mi).

== Location ==
Hafursey lies to the north of the black outwash plain of Mýrdalssandur, south of a side glacier of the Mýrdalsjökull, called Kötlujökull.

== Shape ==
The mountain, which is approximately triangular in shape, has some peaks and is also divided into two parts by a gorge called Klofgil. This extends as much of a mountain as a whole from southeast to north-west. The western part of Hafursey is the highest and is called Skálafjall (582 m (1,909 ft)), to the north is a secondary peak called Kistufell (525 m (1,722 ft)).

== Geology ==
The mountain was created during the Ice Age and consists of palagonite.

However, it probably does not belong to Katla, but feeds from its own source of magma. One can imagine its origin in one or more eruptions similar to that of Surtsey, but it far surpasses this real island in size. In addition, it was not born in the sea, but under an Ice Age glacier.

After the end of the Ice Age, the mountain was temporarily an island, which is still recognisable, hence the name. However, in the case of an island of a special kind, the numerous jökulhlaups of the Katla repeatedly remade it and contributed to its erosion. Kötlujökull plays a leading role in this, because it has the largest amount of glacier ice and water, which can then be released with a volume of up to 100,000 or even 200,000 m2 / sec. running over the outwash plain.

== Agricultural benefits ==
The land is fertile and good pastureland. For this reason, the farmers of the now abandoned farm Hjörleifshöfði used the mountain as a summer pasture for their sheep.

== Accommodation for travellers ==
In earlier times the main route to southeast Iceland was across Mýrdalssandur at the foot of the mountain, a shelter was built there at the beginning of the 20th century. Previously, travelers had used the Stúka cave on the mountain for the same purpose.

== Hiking ==
Hikers can go to Skálafjall, for example, first following the road track from the hut about 2.5 km (1.6 mi) to the west and then ascending via an incision, which in a certain way represents the extension of the Klofgil to the southeast.

== In popular culture ==
The area was used for location filming for the 2016 Star Wars spinoff film Rogue One.

== See also ==
- Geography of Iceland
- List of volcanoes in Iceland
