= Hjörleifshöfði =

Mountain in Iceland

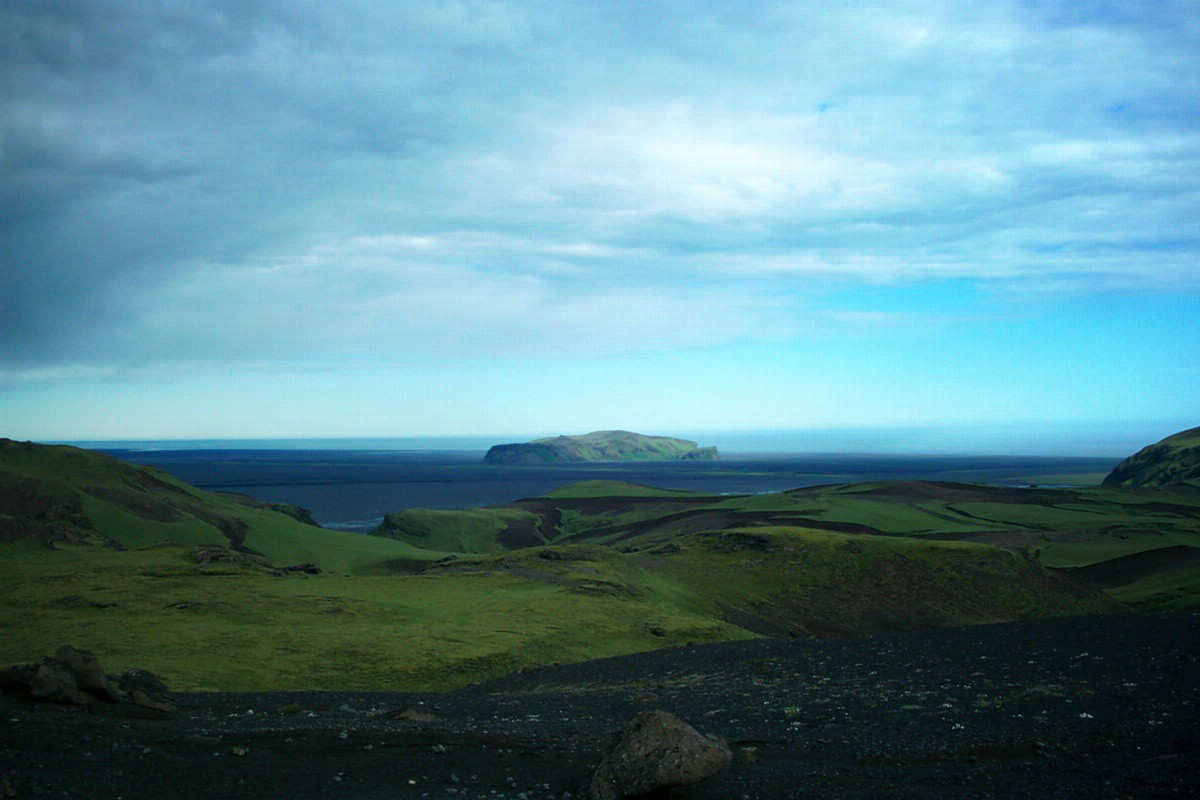
- A view of Hjörleifshöfði from the foothills of Katla to the northwest

Highest point
- Elevation: 221 m (725 ft)
- Coordinates: 63°25′00″N 18°46′00″W

Geography
- Location within Iceland
- Location: Vestur-Skaftafellssýsla, Southern Region, Iceland

Geology
- Mountain type: Inselberg

Hjörleifshöfði (Icelandic: [ˈçœrˌleifsˌhœvðɪ]) is a 221 m (725 ft)-high inselberg in southern Iceland. It consists of palagonite. The mountain is located on the Mýrdalssandur outwash plain about 15 km (9.3 mi) east of Vík í Mýrdal, and was an island in the Atlantic Ocean.

== Name ==
The name was given to the mountain by one of the first legendary settlers mentioned in the Landnámabók.

According to this, Hjörleifr Hróðmarsson was the blood brother of Ingólfur Arnarson, Iceland's first official settler. He settled at Hjörleifshöfði towards the end of the ninth century. There, however, he was slain by his slaves. The slaves fled to Vestmannaeyjar, where Ingólfur took his revenge for his friend and slew them.

On the top of the mountain is a mound called Hjörleifshaugur [ˈçœrˌleifsˌhœyːɣʏr̥], where Hjörleifr is said to be buried.

== Geology ==
The mountain is of volcanic origin but was covered by ice or seawater at the time of its formation, so it has a similar past as the nearby larger Hafursey mountain. Then it was an island surrounded by sea. At the time of the settlement of Iceland, it was already connected to the mainland, but there was still a fjord at its side, which was used to shore ships.

Later, the jökulhlaups, connected with the eruptions of the Katla volcano in Mýrdalsjökull, gathered so much sand and gravel that it was now not at the shore but surrounded by the mainland and the fjord was filled.

After the eruption of Katla in 1918, a tongue of land, Kötlutangi [ˈkʰœhtlʏˌtʰauɲcɪ], led out into the sea so far that it was regarded as the southernmost point of Iceland. Meanwhile, however, the sea eroded it to the point that this title again belongs to the peninsula of Dyrhólaey.

== Farm ==
By AD 874 there was a farm of the same name on the mountain. After the outbreaks of Katla in 1660 or 1721 it had been moved up.

The farm was regarded as relatively well-off because of the side-income from the hunt for seabirds and the collection of eggs.

== In popular culture ==
Yoda Cave (Icelandic: Gígjagjá) is a small natural lava cave located at the base of Hjörleifshöfði on Iceland’s south coast, near the village of Vík í Mýrdal. The cave is informally known as “Yoda Cave” because the outline of its entrance resembles the head of the Star Wars character Yoda.

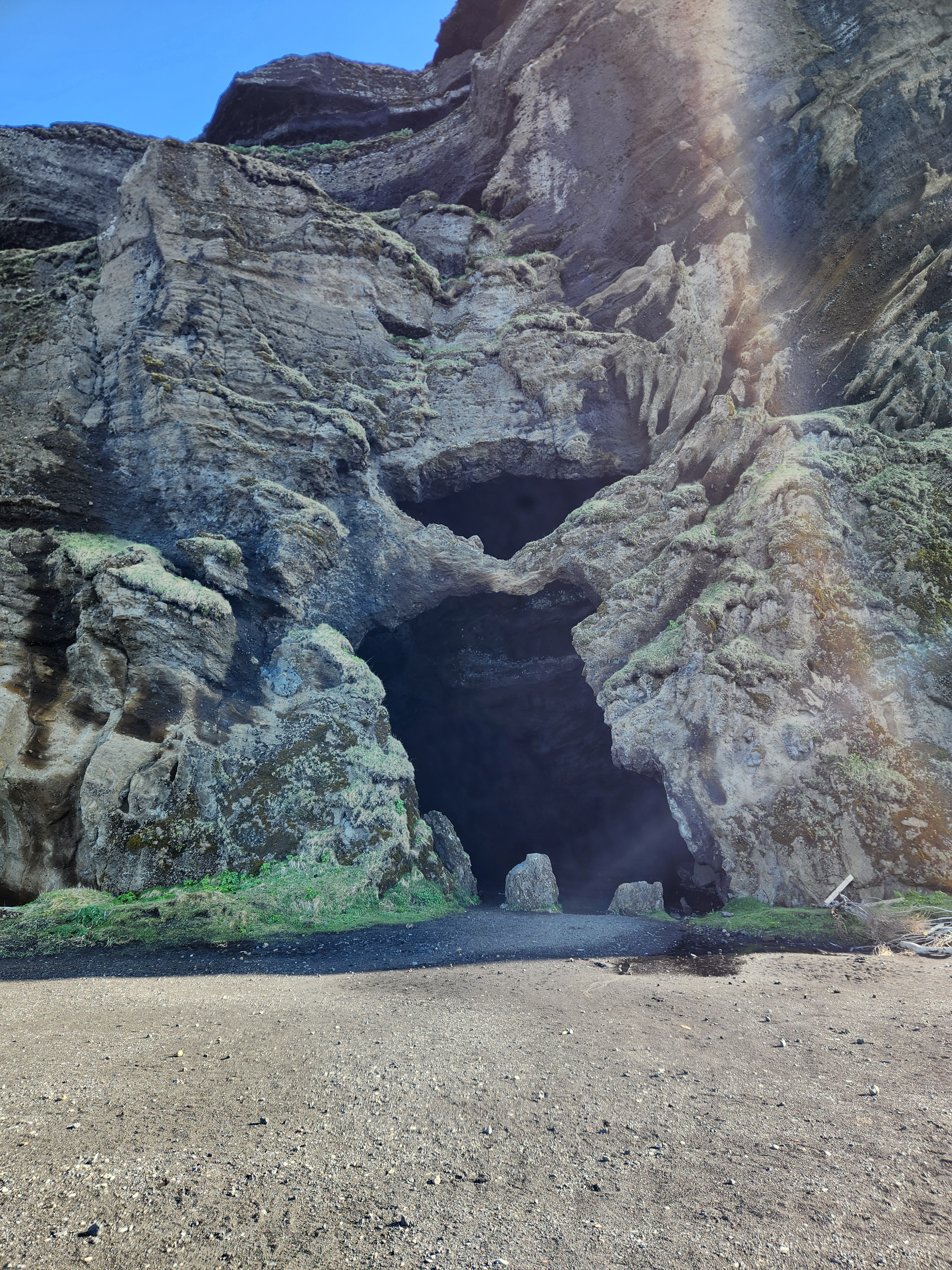
Yoda Cave entrance

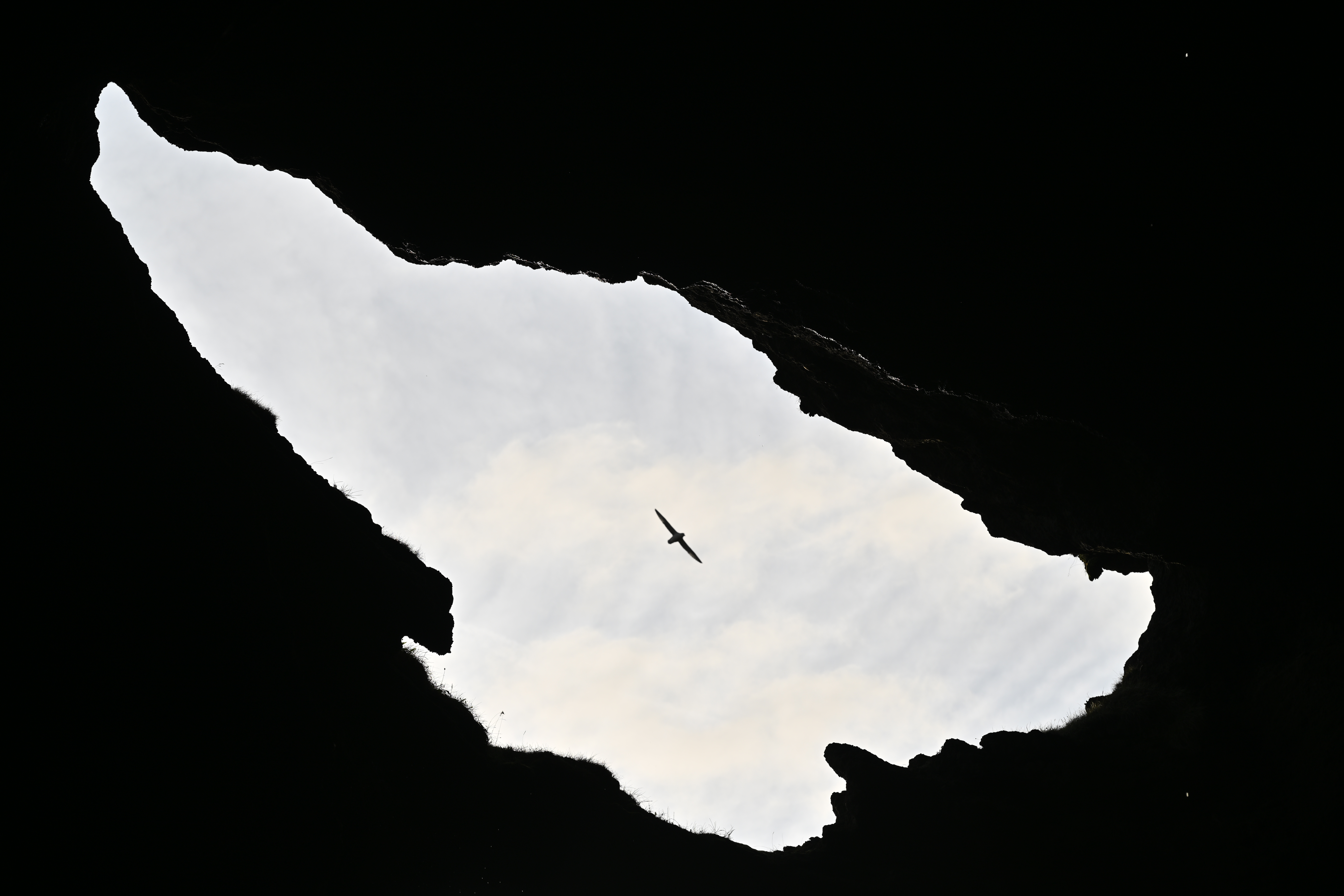
View from inside the Yoda Cave through the bat-shaped opening

The cave has gained popularity through travel guides and social media, particularly following the use of the surrounding Hjörleifshöfði area as a filming location for the 2016 Star Wars spinoff film Rogue One.

The music video for Who Is It by Björk, off of the album Medúlla, was filmed in Hjörleifshöfði.

Christopher Nolan's film The Odyssey (2026) was filmed in Hjörleifshöfði.

== See also ==
- Geography of Iceland
- List of volcanoes in Iceland
- History of Iceland
