= Ingvild Deila =

Norwegian actress (born 1987)

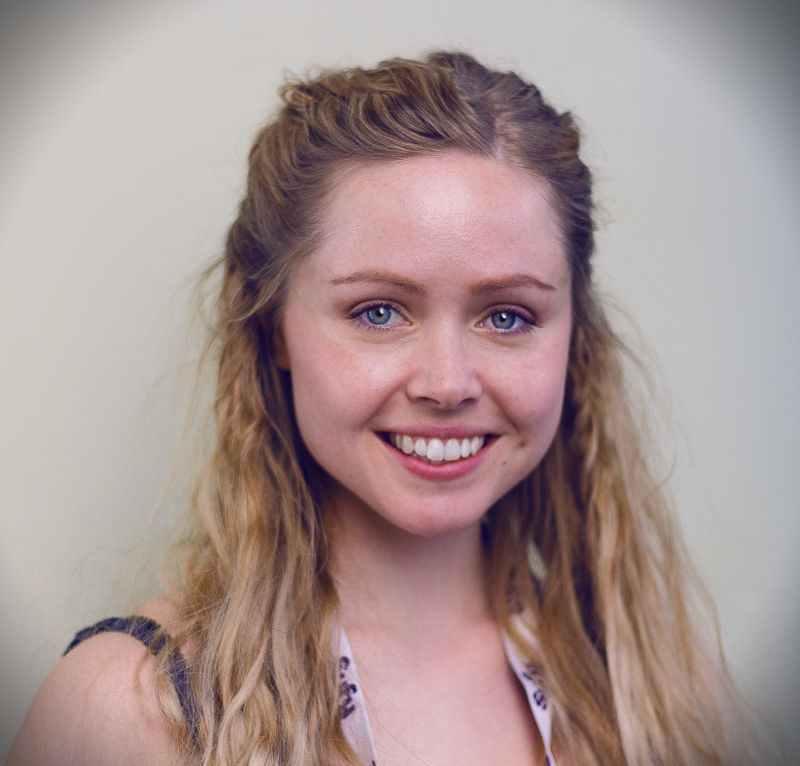
- Deila at Toulouse Game Show Springbreak in 2017
- Born: 18 January 1987 (age 39); Norway
- Occupation: Actress
- Years active: 2013–present

Ingvild Deila (born 1987), sometimes credited as Ingvild Syntropia, is a Norwegian actress. She is known for her roles in both low-budget independent films and large-scale blockbusters. She first appeared in film through her role as Mina in FISH (2013); this was followed by roles in 7 films all in 2014. This led to her role in the Marvel Cinematic Universe as a World Hub scientist in Oslo in Avengers: Age of Ultron (2015). Deila also played Princess Leia through motion capture in Rogue One (2016).

== Career ==
Deila joined the Marvel Cinematic Universe in the 2015 film Avengers: Age of Ultron as the World Hub lead scientist.

Deila made a brief appearance as Princess Leia in the 2016 film Rogue One: A Star Wars Story. With the film set before 1977's Star Wars: Episode IV – A New Hope, a computer-generated image of a young Carrie Fisher was superimposed over Deila's face. Archival audio of Fisher saying "Hope" was used to voice the character.

== Filmography ==
| Year | Title | Role | Notes | Ref. |
|---|---|---|---|---|
| 2013 | FISH | Mina | | |
| 2014 | The Kindness of Strangers | | | |
| 2014 | Indestructible | Jenny Adams | | |
| 2014 | The Gulf of Narcolepsy | | | |
| 2014 | Hopeless Cleptomantic | | | |
| 2014 | The Writer's Daughter | | | |
| 2014 | This Is Not Happening | Anna | | |
| 2014 | Hills | Subi | | |
| 2015 | Run | | | |
| 2015 | Avengers: Age of Ultron | World Hub Tech | | |
| 2015 | Cropped | Helga | | |
| 2015 | Killer Bird | Andreea | | |
| 2015 | Lady Mercy | The Lady | | |
| 2016 | Endless Summer | Annie | | |
| 2016 | The Date | Anna | | |
| 2016 | Punch Bag | Naomi | | |
| 2016 | Rogue One | Princess Leia | Motion capture | |
| 2017 | The Inner | Morgana | | |
| 2018 | Hippopotamus | Ruby Ann Wattz | | |
| 2019 | Baumbacher Syndrome | Journalist Elle | | |
| 2022 | Escape from Brazil | Eva | | |

== Gallery ==
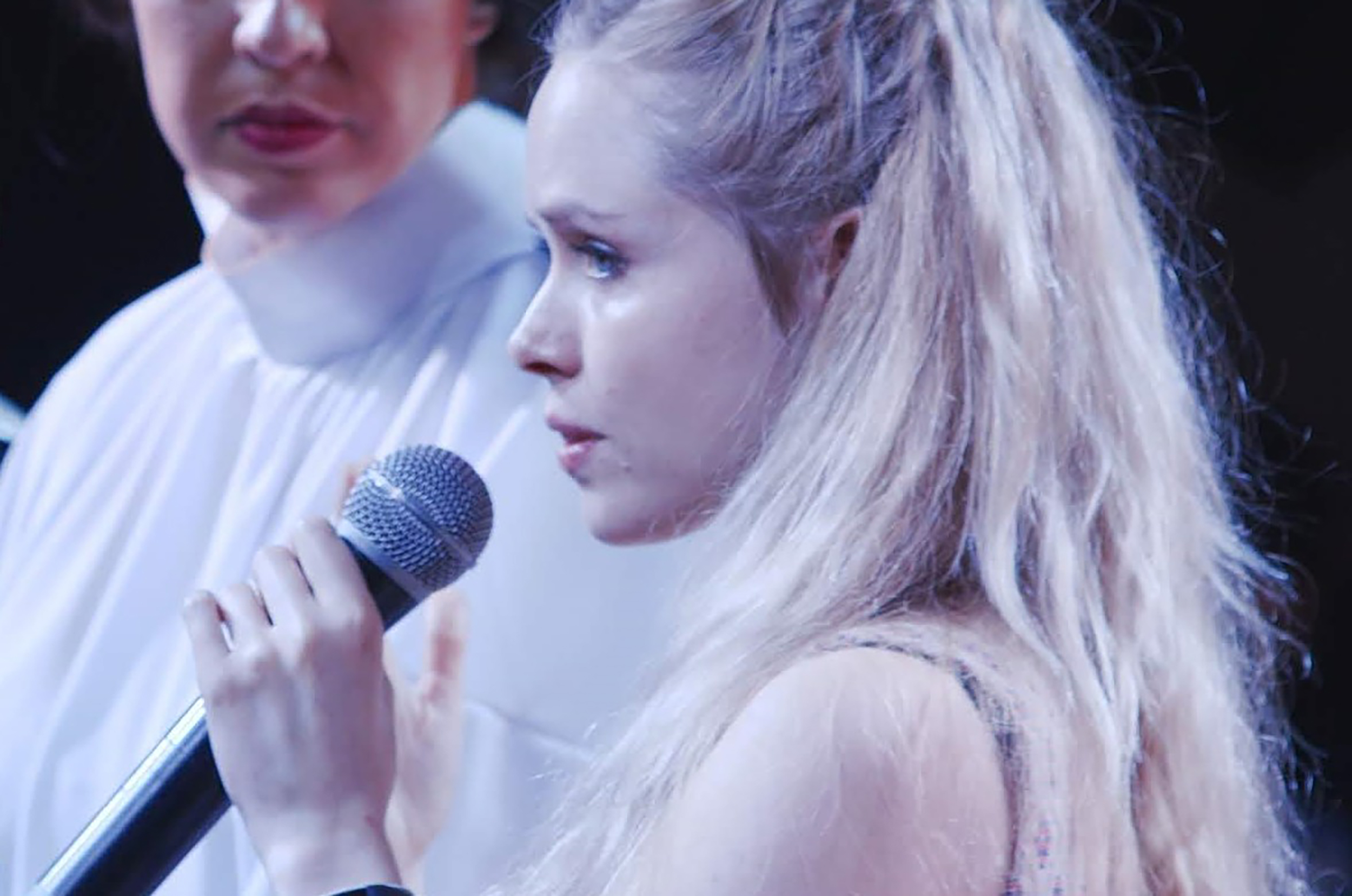
Syntropia speaks to an audience at the 21st Shinobi Spirit 2018 in Curitiba, Brazil (2018)
