= Rogue One =

2016 film by Gareth Edwards

Rogue One: A Star Wars Story
- Theatrical release poster
- Directed by: Gareth Edwards
- Screenplay by: Chris Weitz; Tony Gilroy
- Story by: John Knoll; Gary Whitta
- Based on: Characters by George Lucas
- Produced by: Kathleen Kennedy; Allison Shearmur; Simon Emanuel
- Starring: Felicity Jones; Diego Luna; Ben Mendelsohn; Donnie Yen; Mads Mikkelsen; Alan Tudyk; Jiang Wen; Forest Whitaker
- Cinematography: Greig Fraser
- Edited by: John Gilroy; Jabez Olssen; Colin Goudie
- Music by: Michael Giacchino
- Production company: Lucasfilm Ltd.
- Distributed by: Walt Disney Studios Motion Pictures
- Release dates: December 10, 2016 (Pantages Theatre); December 16, 2016 (United States)
- Running time: 134 minutes
- Country: United States
- Language: English
- Budget: $200–280.2 million
- Box office: $1.059 billion

Rogue One: A Star Wars Story is a 2016 American epic space opera film directed by Gareth Edwards and written by Chris Weitz and Tony Gilroy. Produced by Lucasfilm and distributed by Walt Disney Studios Motion Pictures, it is the first Star Wars anthology film and a prequel to Star Wars (1977). (Note: Later titled Star Wars: Episode IV – A New Hope) It stars Felicity Jones, Diego Luna, Ben Mendelsohn, Donnie Yen, Mads Mikkelsen, Alan Tudyk, Riz Ahmed, Jiang Wen, and Forest Whitaker. Set a week before the events of Star Wars, the film follows rebels who steal the schematics for the Galactic Empire's ultimate weapon, the Death Star. It details the Rebel Alliance's first effective victory against the Empire, as referenced in the Star Wars opening crawl.

John Knoll, who served as the visual effects supervisor of the Star Wars prequel trilogy, pitched Rogue One's story as an episode of the unproduced television series Star Wars: Underworld in 2003. He pitched it again as a film following Disney's acquisition of Lucasfilm in 2012; Edwards was hired to direct in 2014. Edwards sought to differentiate Rogue One from previous Star Wars films and approach it as a war film, omitting the opening crawl and transitional screen wipes used in the main "Skywalker Saga" installments. Principal photography began at Pinewood Studios, Buckinghamshire, in early August 2015 and wrapped in February 2016. The film went through extensive reshoots in mid-2016. The score was composed by Michael Giacchino, rather than the Skywalker Saga composer John Williams. With an estimated production budget of $200–280.2 million, Rogue One is one of the most expensive films ever made.

Rogue One premiered in Los Angeles on December 10, 2016, and was theatrically released in the United States on December 16. It received positive reviews, with praise for its acting, story, visuals, musical score, cinematography, and darker tone than previous Star Wars films, but criticism for its pacing and digital recreations of Carrie Fisher and Peter Cushing. The film grossed $1 billion worldwide, becoming the second-highest-grossing film of 2016, and received two Academy Award nominations for Best Sound Mixing and Best Visual Effects. Andor, a prequel television series, aired on the streaming service Disney+ for two seasons from 2022 to 2025.

== Plot ==
Research scientist Galen Erso and his family are in hiding on the planet Lah'mu when Imperial weapons developer Orson Krennic arrives to press him into completing the Death Star, a superweapon capable of destroying planets. Galen's wife Lyra is killed in the confrontation while their daughter Jyn escapes and is rescued by Rebel extremist Saw Gerrera.

Fifteen years later, cargo pilot Bodhi Rook defects from the Empire, taking a holographic message from Galen to Saw on the moon Jedha. Rebel Alliance intelligence officer Cassian Andor learns of the Death Star and Bodhi's defection from an informant at Kafrene. Jyn is freed from an Imperial labor camp on Wobani and is brought to the Rebels' base on Yavin 4, where Rebel leader Mon Mothma convinces her to find Galen so the Alliance can learn more about the superweapon. Cassian is covertly ordered to aid Jyn but to kill Galen rather than extract him.

Jyn, Cassian, and reprogrammed former Imperial droid K-2SO travel to Jedha, where the Empire loots kyber crystals to power the Death Star. In Jedha City, Saw and his partisans are engaged in an armed insurgency against the Empire, and Jyn and Cassian get caught in the crossfire. Aided by blind spiritual warrior Chirrut Îmwe and his mercenary friend Baze Malbus, Jyn makes contact with Saw, who is holding Bodhi. Saw shows her the message in which Galen reveals he has secretly built a vulnerability into the Death Star. The schematics are located in an Imperial data vault on the planet Scarif.

Onboard the Death Star, Krennic orders a test-fire, which destroys Jedha City. Jyn and her group take Bodhi and flee the moon, but accidentally leave Galen's message behind. Saw chooses to stay behind and dies in the explosion. Imperial governor Grand Moff Tarkin congratulates Krennic before using Bodhi's defection as a pretext to take control of the Death Star. Bodhi leads the group to Galen's Imperial research facility on the planet Eadu, where Cassian hesitates to kill Galen. Rebel bombers then attack the facility; Galen is wounded and dies in Jyn's arms before she escapes with her group on a stolen Imperial cargo shuttle. Krennic is summoned by Darth Vader to answer for the attack on Jedha City. Krennic seeks his support for an audience with the Emperor, but Vader instead Force-chokes him to ensure no further problems occur.

Jyn proposes a mission to steal the Death Star schematics, but the Alliance Council feels there is no chance of victory. Frustrated at their inaction, Jyn's group leads a small squad of volunteers to raid the vault using the stolen Imperial shuttle, which Bodhi dubs "Rogue One." They gain entry through the planet's shield, and Jyn, Cassian, and K-2SO infiltrate the base while the others attack the Imperial garrison as a diversion.

The Alliance learns of the raid from intercepted Imperial communications and deploys the fleet in support, engaging in a space battle against the Imperial forces. K-2SO sacrifices himself so Jyn and Cassian can retrieve the data. Chirrut is killed after activating the switch to allow communication with the Rebel fleet, and Baze is killed shortly afterward. Bodhi is killed by a grenade after informing the Rebel fleet that it must deactivate the planetary shield to let the plans be transmitted. Rebel Admiral Raddus uses an Alliance ship to crash two Imperial Star Destroyers into each other; the wreckage destroys the shield generator. Jyn obtains the plans but is ambushed by Krennic, who is shot and wounded by Cassian. Jyn transmits the plans to the Rebel command ship moments before the Death Star arrives above Scarif. Tarkin then orders the Death Star to destroy the citadel; Krennic is vaporized by the demolition beam, while Jyn and Cassian find themselves unable to escape the explosion, and embrace as they are killed in the ensuing shockwave.

The Rebel fleet begins to jump to hyperspace; however, many ships are intercepted by Darth Vader's Star Destroyer. Vader boards the Rebel command ship and slaughters many troops in an attempt to reclaim the plans, but a smaller ship (Note: Identified off-screen as the Tantive IV, the vessel as depicted in Star Wars (1977), that traveled to Tatooine.) escapes with them. Aboard the fleeing ship preparing to enter hyperspace, Princess Leia Organa declares that the plans will bring hope for the Rebellion.

== Cast ==
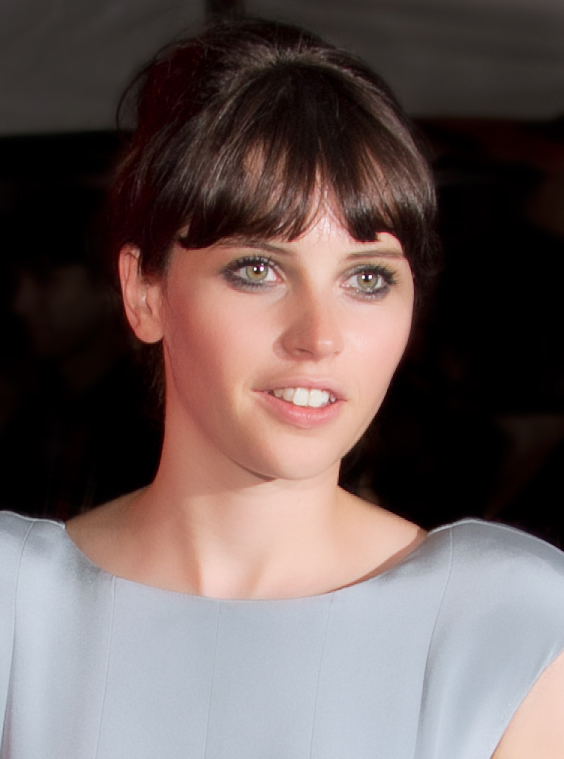
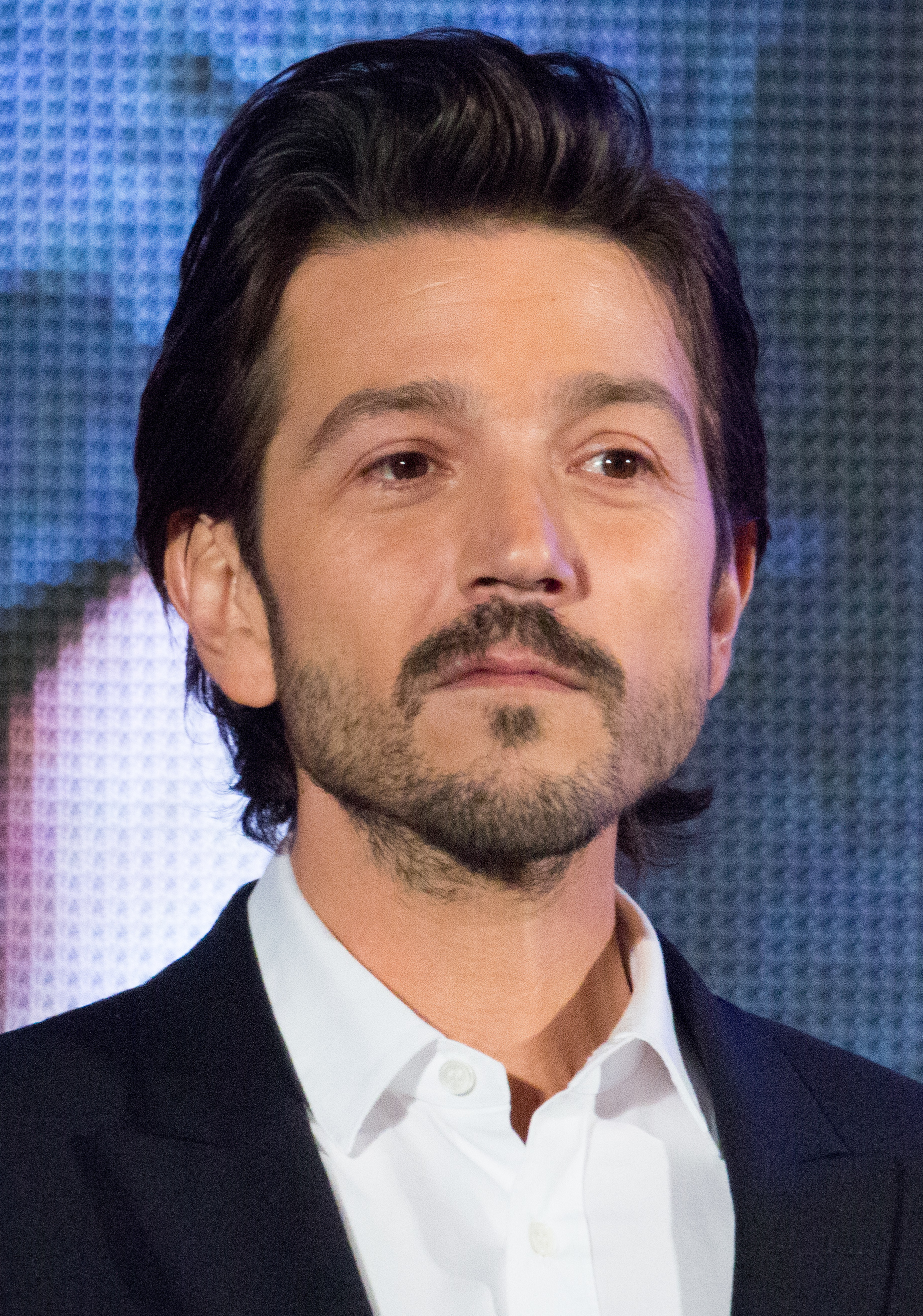
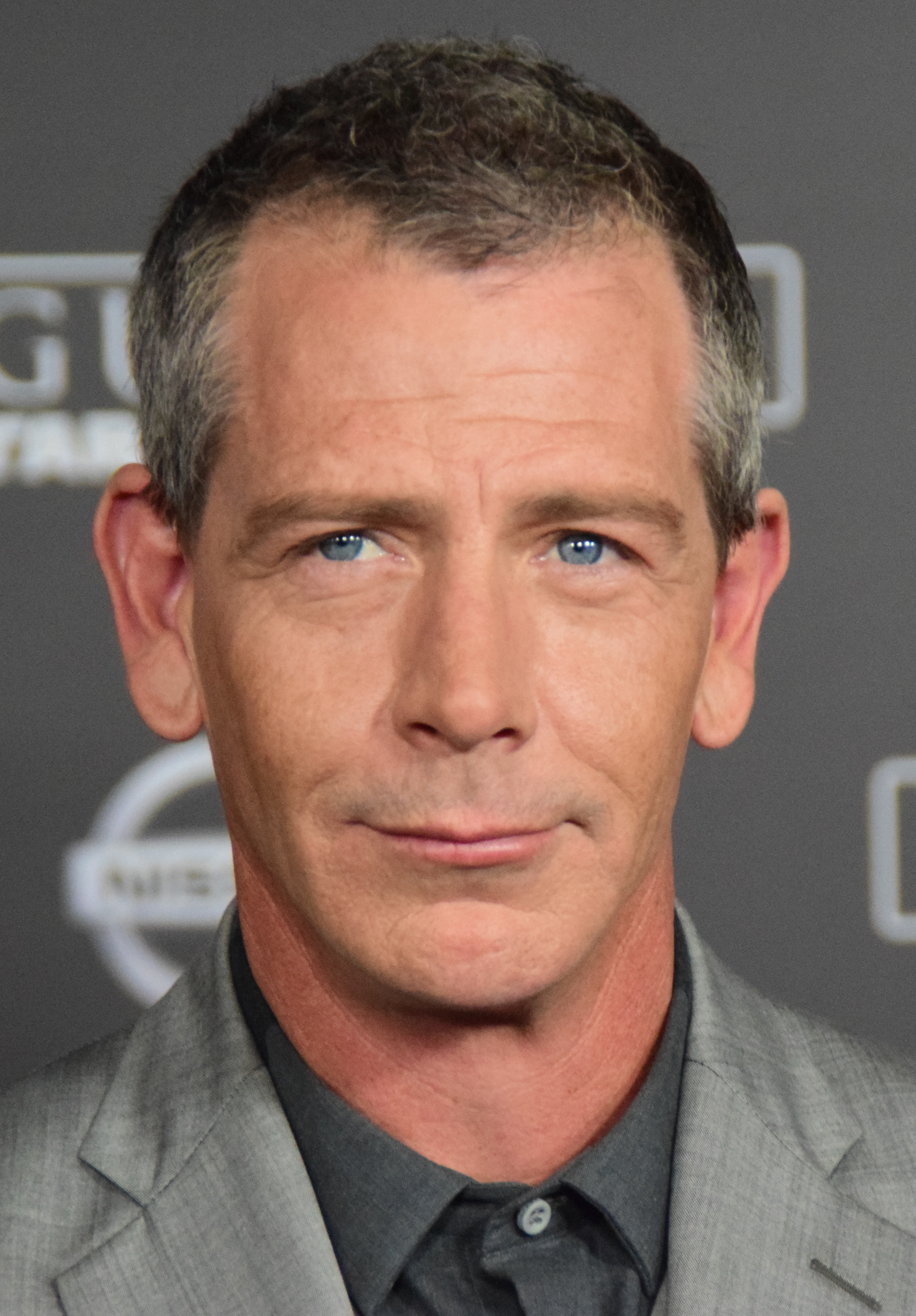
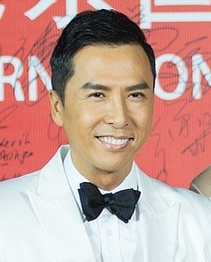
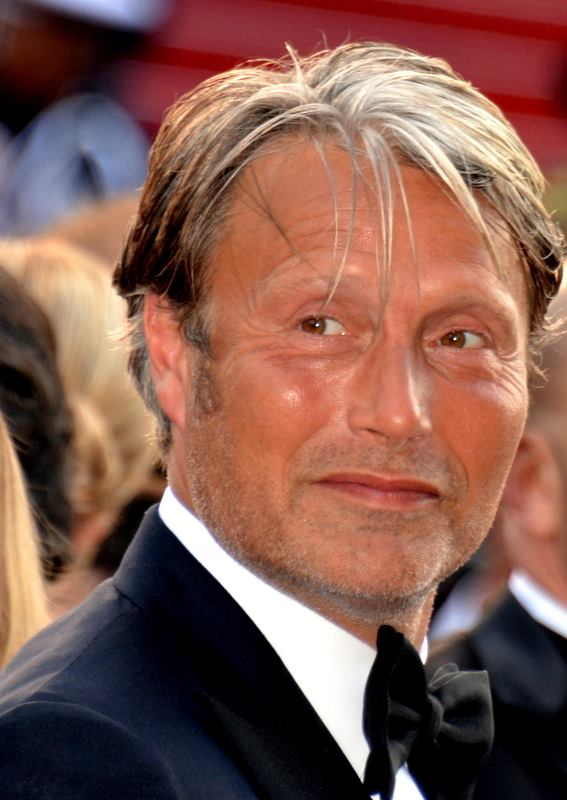
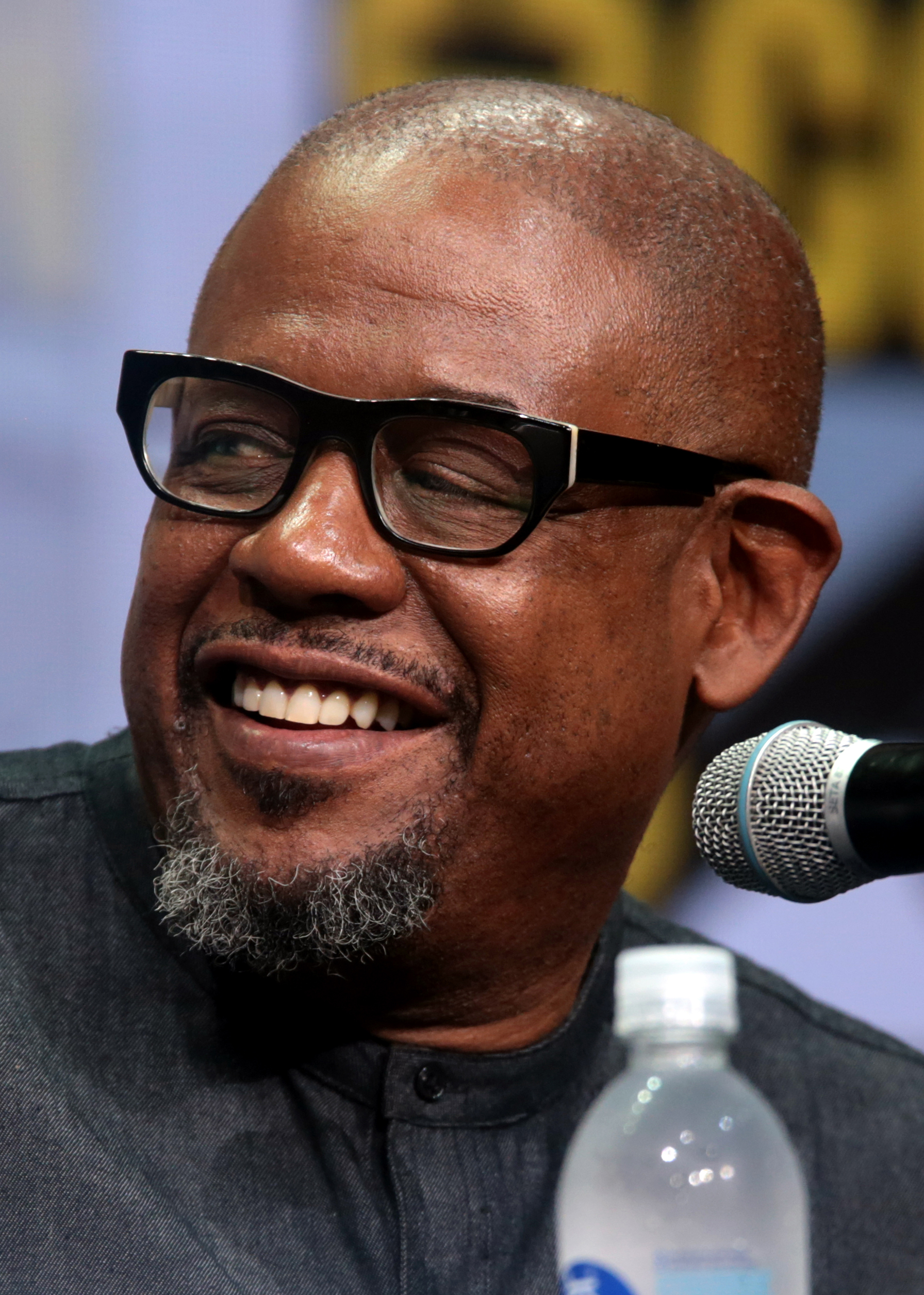
(Top, left to right) Felicity Jones (pictured in 2011), Diego Luna (2017), Ben Mendelsohn (2016); (Bottom) Donnie Yen (2014), Mads Mikkelsen (2016), and Forest Whitaker (2017)
- Felicity Jones as Jyn Erso: A young renegade who is detained for her crimes against the Empire until she is freed by the Rebel Alliance to help steal the plans for the Death Star.
  - Beau Gadsdon as eight-year-old Jyn
  - Dolly Gadsdon as four-year-old Jyn
- Diego Luna as Cassian Andor: A rebel captain and intelligence officer.
- Ben Mendelsohn as Orson Krennic: The director of advanced weapons research for the Imperial military.
- Donnie Yen as Chirrut Îmwe: A blind warrior who believes in the Force but is not a Jedi or a Sith. He is said to be one of the Guardians of the Whills.
- Mads Mikkelsen as Galen Erso: Jyn's father and a research scientist.
- Alan Tudyk as the voice and motion-capture of K-2SO, a former Imperial enforcer droid who was reprogrammed to serve the Rebellion.
- Riz Ahmed as Bodhi Rook: A former Imperial cargo pilot who defects to the rebels under the influence of Galen Erso.
- Jiang Wen as Baze Malbus: A longtime companion of Chirrut Îmwe and one-time devoted Guardian of the Whills, now a rebel warrior and mercenary.
- Forest Whitaker as Saw Gerrera: A veteran of the Clone Wars and a friend of the Erso family who had mentored Jyn in her later childhood years.

Jimmy Smits, Genevieve O'Reilly, Anthony Daniels, and Jimmy Vee reprise their roles from previous films as Bail Organa, Mon Mothma, C-3PO, and R2-D2, respectively; Vee is uncredited for his role. James Earl Jones also reprises his role from previous films as the voice of Darth Vader, who is physically portrayed by Spencer Wilding during the meeting with Krennic and aboard the Star Destroyer, and by Daniel Naprous at the end of the movie. Grand Moff Tarkin and Princess Leia Organa are played by Guy Henry and Ingvild Deila respectively, with the digital likenesses of Peter Cushing and Carrie Fisher superimposed. Henry also provides the voice for Tarkin, while archival audio of Fisher is used for Leia's dialogue. Angus MacInnes and Drewe Henley are featured as Gold Leader Dutch Vander and Red Leader Garven Dreis respectively, via unused footage from A New Hope; MacInnes returned to record new dialogue for Vander, while new dialogue for the deceased Henley was assembled from archival material. David Ankrum, who voiced Wedge Antilles in A New Hope, reprises his role in a vocal cameo. Ian McElhinney, Michael Smiley, Andy de la Tour, and Tim Beckmann play General Jan Dodonna, Dr. Evazan, General Hurst Romodi, and Captain Raymus Antilles, respectively. Warwick Davis plays Weeteef Cyubee, a member of Saw Gerrera's Partisans. Dave Filoni reprises his role as C1-10P from Star Wars Rebels. Stephen Stanton voices Admiral Raddus, while Paul Kasey appears in costume as the alien character on-screen.

Duncan Pow plays Ruescott Melshi, a sergeant in the Rebel Alliance. Additionally, Alistair Petrie plays General Davits Draven, Ben Daniels plays General Antoc Merrick, and Valene Kane plays Lyra Erso, Jyn's mother. Jonathan Aris, Fares Fares, and Sharon Duncan-Brewster appear as Senators Nower Jebel, Vasp Vaspar, and Tynnra Pamlo, respectively. Simon Farnaby plays a member of Blue Squadron. Jordan Stephens appears as Rebel Alliance member Corporal Tonc. Nick Kellington plays Bistan, a door gunner on a U-wing during the battle on Scarif. Ian Whyte plays Moroff, a member of Saw Gerrera's Partisans. Daniel Mays appears as Tivik. Rian Johnson and Ram Bergman, director and producer of Star Wars: The Last Jedi, respectively, cameo as two Death Star technicians.

== Production ==
=== Development ===
In 2003, during the production of Star Wars: Episode III – Revenge of the Sith in Sydney, John Knoll, the visual effects supervisor for all three prequels, pitched an episode for the unproduced series Star Wars: Underworld. At the time, he had written a short treatment called "Destroyer of Worlds". After the Disney acquisition he felt as though he had to pitch it again or forever wonder "what might've happened if I had." In May 2014, Disney announced that Gareth Edwards would direct the film and that Gary Whitta would write the script. In October of the same year, cinematographer Greig Fraser revealed that he was hired to work on the film. In January 2015, it was revealed that Whitta had completed his work on the script and would no longer be involved with the project. Simon Kinberg was considered as a replacement. Later that month, it was announced Chris Weitz had signed to continue the script's development for the film. In March 2015, the title Rogue One was officially revealed. (Note: In April 2020, some of the film's working titles were revealed, including Dark Times and Star Wars: Rebellion.)

Edwards stated the style of the film would be similar to that of a war film, stating, "It's the reality of war. Good guys are bad. Bad guys are good. It's complicated, layered; a very rich scenario in which to set a movie." Assuming Disney would not allow a dark ending, Edwards had the main characters surviving in the original version of the script. However, the producers opted for a more tragic ending and never filmed the original version.

In May 2016, reports emerged that the film would undergo five weeks of reshoots with Tony Gilroy writing additional scenes, as well as acting as a second-unit director under Edwards. With input from Edwards, Gilroy oversaw the edit and additional photography of the film which tackled several issues, including the ending. In August, Gilroy was given screenplay credit alongside Weitz and was paid $5 million for his work on the film. Additionally, Christopher McQuarrie, Scott Z. Burns, and Michael Arndt all contributed to the script at various stages in development.

In July 2016, discussing whether the film would feature an opening crawl, Kathleen Kennedy said, "we're in the midst of talking about it, but I don't think these [anthology] films will have an opening crawl." Edwards explained that the film was "supposed to be different than the saga films," and that "This film is born out of a crawl. ... There's this feeling that if we did a crawl, then it'll create another movie." In November 2016, Kennedy confirmed the film would not feature an opening crawl, instead beginning in "a way that is traditional, with just the title."

At the 2016 Star Wars Celebration, Edwards said that the film's title had three underlying meanings: "a military sign," referring to the Red Squadron from A New Hope; "the 'rogue' one" of the franchise, given it is the first film to not be part of the main saga; and a description of Jyn Erso's personality.

=== Casting ===
In January 2015, The Hollywood Reporter stated numerous actresses, including Tatiana Maslany, Rooney Mara, and Felicity Jones were being assessed for the film's lead. In February 2015, it was announced that Jones was in final talks to star in the film, while Aaron Paul and Édgar Ramírez were being eyed for the male lead role. In March 2015, Jones was officially cast as Jyn Erso. In March 2015, it was rumored that Ben Mendelsohn was being considered for a lead role. The next month, it was reported that Sam Claflin was being looked at for an unspecified role, while Riz Ahmed was in negotiations to join the film. In May, Mendelsohn, Ahmed, and Diego Luna were added to the cast in lead roles of the film. Forest Whitaker was cast in June 2015. In July 2015, Jonathan Aris was chosen to play Senator Jebel. Genevieve O'Reilly was cast as Mon Mothma, reprising her role from Star Wars: Episode III – Revenge of the Sith. James Earl Jones was confirmed to return as the voice of Darth Vader in June 2016.

=== Filming ===
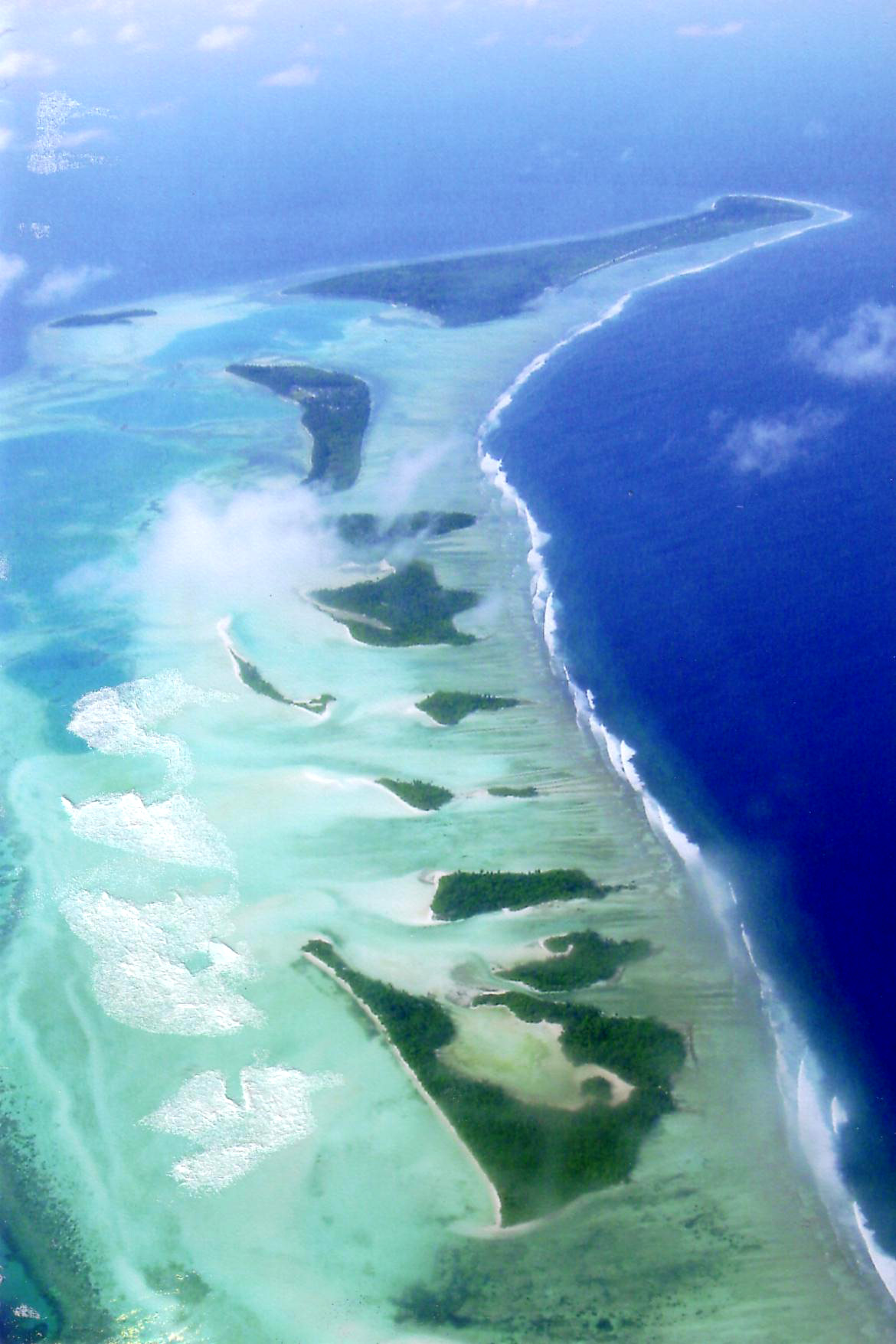
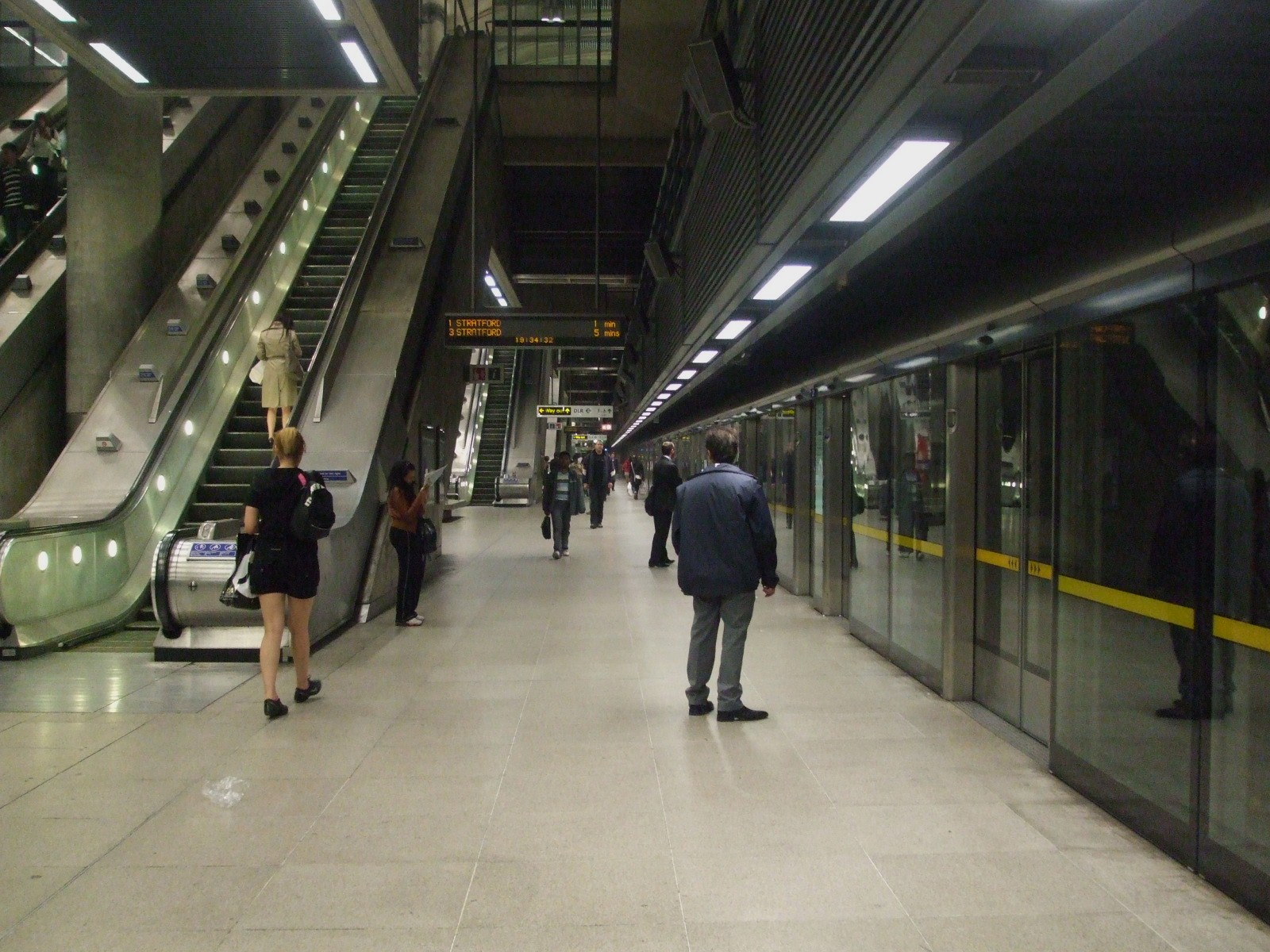
Laamu Atoll in the Maldives (left) and Canary Wharf tube station (right) were used as filming locations for Scarif.

Principal photography on the film began at Pinewood Studios, Buckinghamshire, on August 8, 2015, where huge sets were built to complement scenes that were to be filmed elsewhere in the world. The movie was shot using Ultra Panavision 70 lenses with Arri Alexa 65 large format digital 6K cameras.

Filming also took place in various locations around the world. In Iceland, the crew shot in Reynisfjara, and around the mountains of Hjörleifshöfði and Hafursey at Mýrdalssandur, which were used to represent the Erso homestead on Lah'mu and the Imperial research facility on Eadu respectively. Also used as filming locations were the Krafla area with its volcanic crater and around Lake Mývatn's rock formations. The islands of Gan and Baresdhoo of the Laamu Atoll in the Maldives, as well as the former RAF Bovingdon airfield, were used to represent Scarif. Wadi Rum in Jordan and the fortification of Masada in Israel was used to represent Jedha. Pymmes Park in Edmonton, London was also used for location filming, and scenes set on Yavin 4 were filmed at Cardington Airfield. Gareth Edwards selected the London Underground's Canary Wharf station as a location for a chase scene in an Imperial base; the location shoot took place overnight, when the station was closed to the public.

Early reports put the production budget of the film at $200 million. After the film was released, according to reports based on tax filing in the United Kingdom, the film had spent an estimated total of $280.2 million and was eligible for UK film production tax breaks which brought the final net cost down to $232.4 million. (Note: Bar chart graphics in source detail the gross spend of $280.2 million and the net cost of $232.4 million)

=== Post-production ===
On February 11, 2016, Disney executives stated the film was "virtually completed." Several weeks of pre-scheduled reshoots began in June 2016. Tony Gilroy, who was an uncredited writer on the film at the time, was hired to direct the reshoots and rework aspects of the film, earning him a screenwriting credit. In 2023, Edwards disputed the reports that he was sidelined during the reshoots, saying that he remained heavily involved during the reshoots and worked with Gilroy. The very last scene to be shot was Darth Vader attacking the rebels. It was created by solely using digital tools.

Industrial Light & Magic (ILM) produced the film's visual effects. ILM used CGI and digitally altered archive footage to insert Peter Cushing's likeness over the body of actor Guy Henry. Lucasfilm secured permission from the late actor's estate to include him in the film. The team searched through archival footage of Cushing footage in order to find suitable reference material, and Henry provided the motion capture and voice work. A digital model of Cushing was mapped over Henry's performance like a digital body mask. Cushing's mannerisms, including his manner of speaking, were studied by the creative team and applied to the digital Tarkin model. Cushing's estate was heavily involved with the creation and had input right down to "small, subtle adjustments." A similar process was used in the portrayal of Princess Leia; Carrie Fisher's appearance as Leia in the first film was superimposed over the face of Norwegian actress Ingvild Deila and archival audio of Fisher saying "hope" was used to voice the character.

Post-production of the film wrapped on November 28, 2016.

== Music ==
It does borrow from traditions that both John Williams and George Lucas borrowed from when they made the original Star Wars, you know. George was looking at Flash Gordon, the old serials, and John was looking at Gustav Holst and different composers along the way to get a baseline for what he wanted to communicate. There is a wonderful musical language that John put together for the original films. I wanted to honor that vernacular but still do something new with it, something that was still me in a way.

— Michael Giacchino, on balancing the musical traditions of Star Wars with his original music for Rogue One.

In March 2015, it was reported that Alexandre Desplat who had worked with Edwards on Godzilla (2014), would compose the score for Rogue One, and had confirmed it in an April 2016 interview. As the film's reshooting affected the post-production process, Desplat opted out from the project due to his commitments for scoring Valerian and the City of a Thousand Planets (2017), and was replaced by Michael Giacchino in September 2016. Giacchino only had four and a half weeks to compose the music for the film, beginning almost immediately after finishing scoring Doctor Strange. In addition to composing original themes, Giacchino incorporated some of John Williams' themes from previous films into the score. The official soundtrack was released by Walt Disney Records on December 16, 2016. An extended version of the soundtrack was released on February 11, 2022, which includes additional demos composed for the film score, and cues that were not included in the album, or being un-edited. A vinyl edition was further released by Mondo in March 2022.

== Marketing ==
=== Promotion ===
Promotion of Rogue One was initially delayed by the release of the film Mission: Impossible – Rogue Nation in July 2015, because the titles were deemed too similar. Paramount Pictures registered and cleared the title with the Motion Picture Association of America in January 2015, well before Disney announced the title of its forthcoming Star Wars spinoff. Disney and Lucasfilm had to reach an agreement with Paramount over promotion in order to avoid any confusion in the public mind. Disney agreed to embargo promotion on Rogue One until after mid-2015, with the exception of a very short teaser which was screened at Star Wars Celebration in Anaheim that year.

A teaser trailer for Rogue One, released by Lucasfilm on April 7, 2016, was praised by reviewers for its portrayal of strong female characters. The Daily Telegraph described Jyn Erso's character as "a roguish, Han Solo-style heroine," calling the film "progressive," while noting its painstaking faithfulness to the production design style of the original Star Wars trilogy. The Hollywood Reporter also noted the visual nods to the original trilogy, and examined the film's possible narrative direction, considering that the outcome is to some extent already revealed in the opening crawl of A New Hope. The Atlantic writer David Sims stated that the trailer brought "back some memorable pieces of architecture, from the lumbering AT-AT walkers to the Death Star itself, not to mention the glorious 70s costuming of Star Wars." He added that the trailer has "the look," blending the old with the new. The trailer was viewed close to 30 million times in its first 29 hours, at a rate of 800,000 views per hour, from Facebook and YouTube, which is 200,000 views short of what the first teaser trailer for Star Wars: The Force Awakens was receiving in November 2014.

In June 2016, Rogue One was promoted at the Star Wars Celebration Europe III event in London. During the event, a new official poster was unveiled, which depicts a battle taking place on the tropical planet Scarif, with the Death Star looming large in a blue sky, above which is printed the tagline "A Rebellion Built on Hope". A second teaser trailer was screened exclusively at the event, and it was reviewed favorably by critics; The Daily Telegraph noted that the trailer revealed new locations such as the planets Jedha and Scarif, and that its most significant revelation came in the final seconds of the teaser, with the appearance of Darth Vader, reflected in a computer screen and accompanied by his classic breathing sound effect. Variety also hailed the Vader reveal, and noted that the emphasis of the production was much more on the kinetic depiction of large battle sequences and full-on warfare, comparing it to Francis Ford Coppola's 1979 Vietnam War epic Apocalypse Now. A showreel was also shown during the event, which featured footage from the film, cut with behind-the-scenes shots and interviews with the director and cast members. The second trailer was shown publicly during a broadcast of the 2016 Summer Olympics and received positive responses; Wired stated that the trailer was "littered with nostalgic throwbacks to the original trilogy," while Rolling Stone described the CGI landscape shots seen in the footage as "eye-poppingly gorgeous."

A further trailer released in October 2016 prompted The Hollywood Reporter to comment that the newly revealed footage looked like "a trailer to a different movie than the one advertised earlier," remarking that Jyn Erso appeared to be portrayed as a more vulnerable character, and highlighting the appearance of Galen Erso as a protective father figure. Vanity Fair also commented on the emphasis given to Jyn's relationship with her father, suggesting that Rogue One was drawing on "the Star Wars franchise's greatest natural resource: daddy issues."

The film's publicity tour began in Mexico on November 23, 2016.

In Asia, Disney focused marketing efforts on Donnie Yen, with his individual poster being used for marketing in territories including Japan, Singapore, Indonesia, Thailand, Hong Kong, China, Vietnam, and Malaysia. The official Star Wars Facebook page of the respective Asian countries also featured clips and videos of Donnie Yen speaking various languages, greeting fans and telling them to support the film. Disney also released various versions of international trailers with more footage of Yen.

=== Tie-in novels ===
A tie-in novel to the film, Catalyst: A Rogue One Novel, was released on November 15, 2016. Written by veteran Star Wars novelist James Luceno, the story is set some years before the events of Rogue One, and provides a backstory to the 2016 film. The novelization of the film was written by Alexander Freed, and released on December 16, 2016.

Months after the film was released, Lucasfilm Press published two further novels, titled Star Wars: Rebel Rising and Star Wars: Guardians of the Whills on May 2, 2017. Rebel Rising was written by Beth Revis, and explains what happened to Jyn Erso between the time her mother died and the day when rebel agents freed her from an Imperial labor camp, a time period that the film skips over in its opening minutes. Guardians of the Whills was written by novelist and comic writer Greg Rucka, and focuses on the characters Chirrut and Baze, telling their backstories as well as giving more context to the events that happened on Jedha prior to the Imperial occupation depicted in the film.

=== Comics ===
Months after the film was released, Marvel Comics adapted the film into a six-part comic book miniseries, which adds extra content. In August 2017, IDW Publishing announced that it would make a one-shot graphic novel adaptation of the film, which was released one day after the Marvel miniseries' collection was released. Unlike the Marvel miniseries, this graphic novel will have slightly more cartoonish visuals.

In the same month, Marvel Comics released the Star Wars: Rogue One – Cassian & K-2SO Special, a non-canon 40-page one-shot comic focusing on the first meeting between Cassian Andor and K-2SO. The comic was written by Duane Swierczynski and pencilled by Fernando Blanco.

=== Video games ===
A downloadable expansion pack for Star Wars Battlefront (2015), titled Rogue One: Scarif, was released in December 2016, and added content based on the film, including new game modes, a map based on the planet Scarif, and Jyn Erso and Orson Krennic as playable characters. A free virtual reality mission for PlayStation 4 was also released alongside the expansion. A Rogue One Play Set was also planned for the game Disney Infinity 3.0 as a purchasable expansion pack. However, it was scrapped alongside the cancellation of the series. A free update for Star Wars Battlefront II (2017) was released in April 2020, adding a different Scarif map and other Rogue One-inspired content. Several characters and concepts from the film were also included in the mobile games Star Wars: Force Arena, Star Wars Commander, and Star Wars: Galaxy of Heroes.

== Release ==
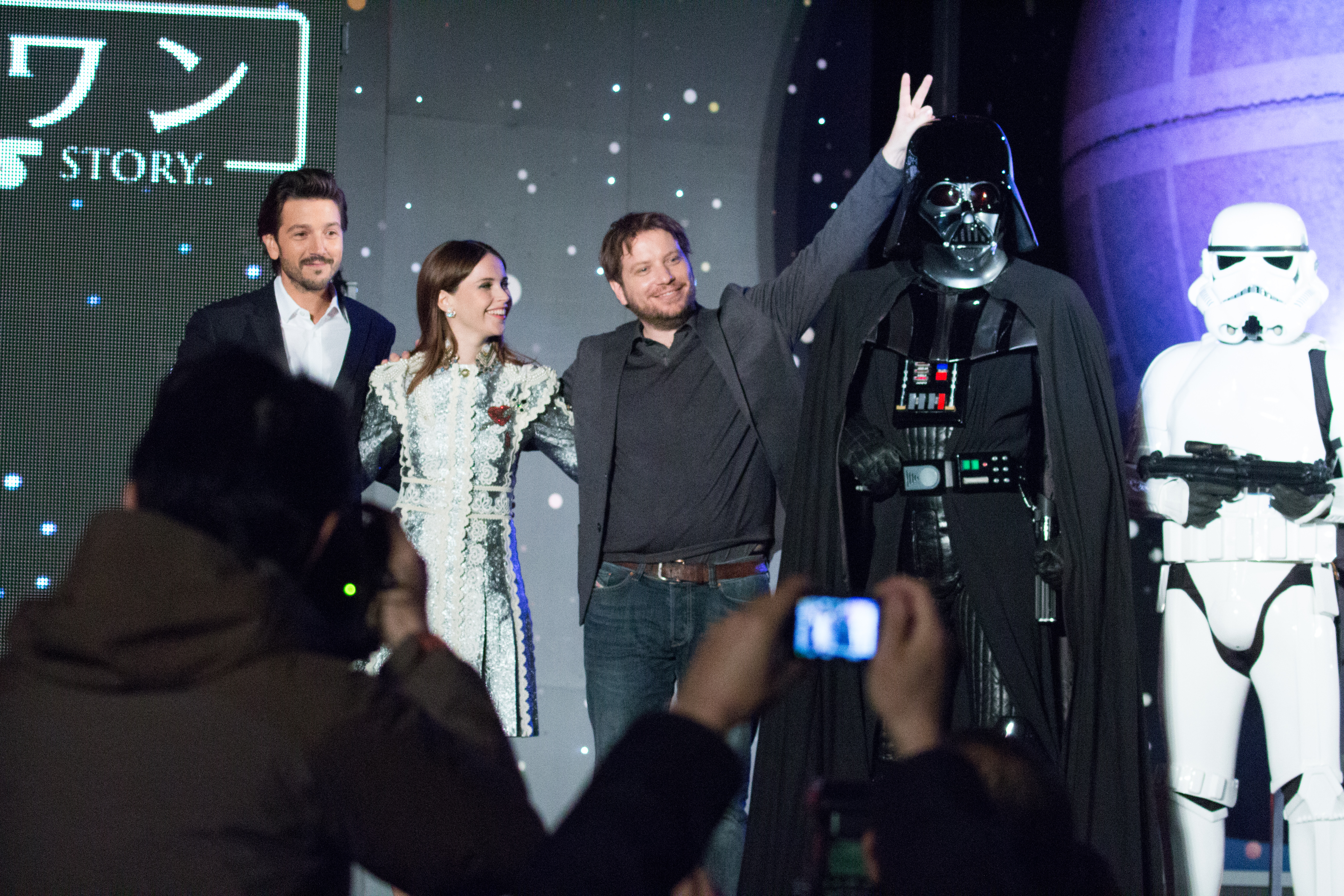
Actors Diego Luna and Felicity Jones and director Gareth Edwards appear at the Rogue One premiere in Japan.

Rogue One premiered at the Pantages Theatre in Los Angeles on December 10, 2016. The film was released in certain European countries on December 14, 2016, in North America on December 16, and in China on January 6, 2017.

Rogue One was released on Digital HD on March 24, 2017, and by Walt Disney Studios Home Entertainment on Blu-ray, Blu-ray 3D, and DVD on April 4. The film made a revenue of $81.1 million with nearly 4 million units sold, making it the third best-selling title of 2017 behind Moana and Beauty and the Beast. It was also released on Ultra HD Blu-ray on March 31, 2020, whilst also being reissued on Blu-ray and DVD.

To promote the release of Andor, Disney re-released Rogue One into over 150 IMAX theaters across the United States and Canada on August 26, 2022, featuring an exclusive preview of the Disney+ series ahead of its three-episode premiere on September 21, 2022.

== Reception ==
=== Box office ===
Rogue One grossed $534.9 million in the United States and Canada, and $523.9 million in other countries, for a worldwide total of $1.059 billion. Deadline Hollywood calculated the film's net profit as $319.6 million, accounting for production budgets, marketing, talent participation, and other costs; box office grosses and home media revenues placed it third on their list of 2016's "Most Valuable Blockbusters".

In late November 2016, box office projections for the United States and Canada had the film grossing $100–150 million during its opening weekend. Disney chairman Bob Iger noted that Disney and Lucasfilm did not expect Rogue One to match The Force Awakens' total gross of $2.1 billion, nor its $248 million opening. Pre-sale tickets for the film went on sale at 12:01 am EST on November 28, 2016. Within 10 minutes, ticket sale sites such as Fandango crashed, much like they had in advance of The Force Awakens the year prior. In its first 24 hours, the film had the second-highest number of pre-sale tickets ever sold, behind only The Force Awakens. Worldwide, the film was expected to gross $280–350 million in its opening weekend.

In the United States, the film made $29 million from its Thursday night previews, making it the highest-grossing Thursday opening of 2016. On Friday, the film grossed $71.1 million, and $46.3 million the next day, securing a total of $155.1 million in its opening weekend, the third-biggest debut of 2016. It topped the box office once again in its second weekend, grossing $64 million (down 58.7%) over the three day weekend, and $96.1 million over the four day weekend. On Christmas Day, it grossed $25.9 million. It finished first at the box office again in its third weekend, grossing $49.6 million (−22.5%) over the three-day weekend and $65.5 million over the four-day weekend. In its fourth weekend, Sunday projections had the film grossing $22 million, besting newcomer Hidden Figures' $21.8 million. However, final figures the following day revealed the film tallied a weekend total of $21.9 million, falling to second place behind Hidden Figures' $22.8 million. The IMAX re-release of the film on August 26, 2022, made $1.1 million over the weekend, bringing its running IMAX total to $105 million, 10th all-time.

=== Critical response ===
The film has received generally favorable reviews, praising its aesthetics and narrative. On Rotten Tomatoes, the film has an approval rating of 84% based on 459 reviews, with an average rating of 7.5/10. The site's critical consensus reads, "Rogue One draws deep on Star Wars mythology while breaking new narrative and aesthetic ground and suggesting a bright blockbuster future for the franchise." On Metacritic, the film has a weighted average score 65 out of 100, based on 51 critics, indicating "generally favorable reviews". Audiences polled by CinemaScore gave the film an average grade of "A" on an A+ to F scale, while PostTrak reported film goers gave the film a 91% overall positive score.

IGN reviewer Eric Goldman gave the film 9 out of 10, describing Rogue One's storytelling being related to the plot of Star Wars (1977) as a "tricky gambit", but praised it for being clear and connected. He also enjoyed the visual aesthetic, which he opined helped establish its own identity, and praised the performances of Jones, Luna, and Tudyk. He disliked that the film's connection to other Star Wars films included the use of digital effects to recreate a character from the original trilogy, whose appearance he thought suffered from the "uncanny valley factor." Peter Travers of Rolling Stone affirmed the film as being reminiscent of the original trilogy, and enjoyed Edwards' direction and the pacing. He especially enjoyed Jones' performance and the action sequences in the third act, although he felt the film's exposition slightly undermined character interactions. Travers went on to give the film 4 stars. /Film rated Rogue One an 8 out of 10, with writer Peter Sciretta enjoying the darker tone, action sequences, Giacchino's score, and felt it retroactively improved Star Wars by providing additional context and backstory. Sciretta wished the film focused on further characterization, which he felt was neglected due to the ensemble cast and runtime.

Justin Chang, writing for the Los Angeles Times, praised Fraser's cinematography and also enjoyed the action sequences, feeling its storytelling would "immediately ascend to classic status" and justified its existence. He particularly emphasized the cast, and commended the performances of Yen, Luna, and Jones; he defended the ensemble cast from criticism by contending it highlighted the film's anti-fascist themes. Chang also speculated that the film had a fast pace to avoid the criticism of slow pacing directed toward the prequel trilogy. Peter Bradshaw, a film critic of The Guardian giving a 4-star rating, enjoyed the film for providing "muscular and adroit" variations on familiar Star Wars elements and themes in addition to the depiction of the Death Star. He also offered general praise for cast performances, including that of Mikkelsen, Mendelsohn, Jones, Tudyk, Yen, and Luna, but felt the film did not "go rogue at any stage" and considered it to be released during the cultural zeitgeist of Star Wars: The Force Awakens (2015). In another 4-star review for The Guardian, Mark Kermode further praised the cast, enjoying the diversity and positively compared Jyn's character to that of Ellen Ripley from the film Aliens (1986). He also praised the cinematography of the battle scenes, which he described as being evocative of the Normandy landings and Vietnam War, and felt the standalone nature of the film allowed it to raise the dramatic stakes during the third act.

In a more critical review, The Washington Post's Ann Hornaday regarded the film as being simplistic and a "placeholder", comparing its imagery to Mad Max: Fury Road (2015) and Arrival (2016). She positively regarded the visual aesthetic, Giacchino's score, and darker tone, but thought the plot was unoriginal and lacked the tone of previous Star Wars films. That said, she regarded the film as superior to the prequel trilogy. Giving a C+ grade, IndieWire's David Ehrlich similarly regarded it as "a spirited but agonizingly safe attempt to ... to keep the wheels greased between proper installments". He lauded the opening scene and final act, saying the latter reminded him of Star Wars "as we remembered it", and praised the set design and visuals as "gorgeous." He also enjoyed how the film reconciled narrative elements between the original and newer Star Wars films, but felt the lack of interesting character development and requirement to adhere to pre-existing narratives was to its detriment. A. O. Scott and Richard Brody, writing for The New York Times and The New Yorker respectively, more heavily scrutinized the film and gave negative reviews. Both felt that it did not expand upon the Star Wars mythos, criticized the script, and considered the film to ultimately not justify its existence. Scott regarded the film as being "mediocre" and primarily critiqued the plot and thematic content, which he believed to be underdeveloped. Meanwhile, Brody, who went on to call it "lobotomized and depersonalized," felt Edwards overlooked many aspects of Star Wars lore. Brody positively regarded Fraser's cinematography, and considered it his favorite element of the film, but was not affected by the death of major characters as he was not emotionally invested in their story.

Rogue One introduced many new characters into the Star Wars mythology, with Chirrut Îmwe, played by Donnie Yen, and K-2SO, played by Alan Tudyk, being the most popular. In a poll on the official Star Wars website in May 2017, in which more than 50,000 people voted, Chirrut Îmwe was voted as the most popular Rogue One character.

George Lucas was reported to have enjoyed the film more than The Force Awakens; upon hearing this, Edwards said, "I can die happy now." Tony Gilroy revealed that he received a call from Lucas saying that he loved the film.

The film was praised for its exploration of ethics in engineering; in a reviewer's words, "the core ethical arc of the film is one man's decision to engineer the Death Star in such a way as to prevent its use for galactic domination. One could fairly re-title the movie to 'Rogue One: an Engineering Ethics Story.'"

James Seddon, writer for the military news website Task & Purpose, lauded Rogue One as the Star Wars film that best reflects real military experience. Many details resonate with his own military service and seem real to veterans: "The spacecraft rattle annoyingly. Places where hands would naturally grab, or gear would rub, have the paint worn off. Cockpit windows are scratched, and, if the sunlight hits them wrong, they are hard to see through. Headphones get hung on a convenient grab rail and not on the hanger designed for them—if there even was a hanger. Apparently, designers of military vehicles in galaxies far, far, away have also never actually operated them in the field." He also pointed to aspects beyond the film's production design, like rebel Lt. Sefla's muzzle discipline, the "bitter stoicism" predominant among characters who "spend most of their time wet, uncomfortable, afraid, and bickering" even as they work diligently to complete their mission, and the moral ambiguity of some of the rebels' actions.

In 2025, it was one of the films voted for the "Readers' Choice" edition of The New York Times' list of "The 100 Best Movies of the 21st Century," finishing at number 176.

=== Digital recreation ===
While much of the computer-generated imagery (CGI) received positive reviews, some news organizations published criticism about certain aspects, including the visual effects that were used to revive Peter Cushing, who had died in 1994, as Grand Moff Tarkin. The Guardian's Catherine Shoard described the "resurrection" as a "digital indignity." Joseph Walsh of The Guardian raised legal and ethical issues about bringing a long-dead actor to life. Lucasfilm had obtained permission from Cushing's estate before deciding to use his likeness. The Washington Times' Eric Althoff rejected the entire concept of using CGI to recreate a deceased actor: "Alas, what we get is, basically, not a simulation, but an approximation of a simulation—a dead character portrayed by a living actor inhabiting not the character, but imitating the dead actor." In September 2024, Kevin Francis, who had been a personal friend of Cushing for many years prior to his death, filed a lawsuit against Disney for “Unjust Enrichment”, claiming that Cushing had made clear that he did not want his likeness reused without his consent.

Some journalists also criticized the quality of the CGI that was used to represent a younger Carrie Fisher in order to portray Princess Leia at an earlier time, as well as its suitability in movie-making. Eliana Dockterman of Time wrote that "there was something particularly plastic about this version of the young Carrie Fisher—so smooth and so perfect it couldn't be real—that pulled me out of the moment." Kelly Lawler of USA Today said that "while Tarkin is merely unnerving, the Leia cameo is so jarring as to take the audience completely out of the film at its most emotional moment. Leia's appearance was meant to help the film end on a hopeful note (quite literally, as 'hope' is her line), but instead it ends on a weird and unsettling one." Michael Cavna of The Washington Post described the facial effect as feeling "distractingly artificial and nearly alien, like a plastered death mask robbed of authentic actorly effect, well beyond the usual artifice of Botox." For her part, Fisher was shown the CGI rendition of her younger self for the film by Kathleen Kennedy and "loved it."

=== Accolades ===
Rogue One received two Academy Award nominations for Best Sound Mixing and Best Visual Effects.

Award	Date of ceremony	Category	Recipients	Result	Ref.
Academy Awards	February 26, 2017	Best Sound Mixing	David Parker, Christopher Scarabosio and Stuart Wilson	Nominated	
Academy Awards	February 26, 2017	Best Visual Effects	Neil Corbould, Hal Hickel, John Knoll and Mohen Leo	Nominated	
British Academy Film Awards	February 12, 2017	Best Makeup and Hair	Amanda Knight, Neal Scanlan and Lisa Tomblin	Nominated	
British Academy Film Awards	February 12, 2017	Best Special Visual Effects	Neil Corbould, Hal Hickel, John Knoll, Mohen Leo and Nigel Sumner	Nominated	
Cinema Audio Society Awards	February 18, 2017	Outstanding Achievement in Sound Mixing for a Motion Picture – Live Action	Joel Iwataki, Nick Kray, David Parker, Frank Rinella, Christopher Scarabosio and Stuart Wilson	Nominated	
Costume Designers Guild Awards	February 21, 2017	Excellence in Fantasy Film	Dave Crossman and Glyn Dillon	Nominated	
Dragon Awards	September 3, 2017	Best Science Fiction or Fantasy Movie	Rogue One	Nominated	
Empire Awards	March 19, 2017	Best Film	Rogue One	Won	
Empire Awards	March 19, 2017	Best Sci-Fi/Fantasy	Rogue One	Nominated	
Empire Awards	March 19, 2017	Best Actress	Felicity Jones	Won	
Empire Awards	March 19, 2017	Best Male Newcomer	Riz Ahmed	Nominated	
Empire Awards	March 19, 2017	Best Director	Gareth Edwards	Won	
Empire Awards	March 19, 2017	Best Costume Design	Rogue One	Nominated	
Empire Awards	March 19, 2017	Best Production Design	Rogue One	Nominated	
Empire Awards	March 19, 2017	Best Make-Up and Hairstyling	Rogue One	Nominated	
Empire Awards	March 19, 2017	Best Visual Effects	Rogue One	Nominated	
Hugo Awards	August 11, 2017	Best Dramatic Presentation – Long form	Chris Weitz and Tony Gilroy	Nominated	
Location Managers Guild Awards	April 8, 2017	Outstanding Locations in Period Film	Mark Somner and David O'Reily	Nominated	
Location Managers Guild Awards	April 8, 2017	Outstanding Film Commission	"Jedha" – Royal Film Commission Jordan	Won	
MTV Movie & TV Awards	May 17, 2017	Movie of the Year	Rogue One	Nominated	
MTV Movie & TV Awards	May 17, 2017	Best Hero	Felicity Jones	Nominated	
Ray Bradbury Award	May 20, 2017	Outstanding Dramatic Presentation	Chris Weitz, Tony Gilroy and Gareth Edwards	Nominated	
Saturn Awards	June 28, 2017	Best Science Fiction Film	Rogue One	Won	
Saturn Awards	June 28, 2017	Best Director	Gareth Edwards	Won	
Saturn Awards	June 28, 2017	Best Writing	Chris Weitz and Tony Gilroy	Nominated	
Saturn Awards	June 28, 2017	Best Actress	Felicity Jones	Nominated	
Saturn Awards	June 28, 2017	Best Supporting Actor	Diego Luna	Nominated	
Saturn Awards	June 28, 2017	Best Music	Michael Giacchino	Nominated	
Saturn Awards	June 28, 2017	Best Editing	John Gilroy, Colin Goudie and Jabez Olssen	Nominated	
Saturn Awards	June 28, 2017	Best Production Design	Doug Chiang and Neil Lamont	Nominated	
Saturn Awards	June 28, 2017	Best Costume Design	David Crossman and Glyn Dillon	Nominated	
Saturn Awards	June 28, 2017	Best Make-up	Amy Byrne	Nominated	
Saturn Awards	June 28, 2017	Best Special Effects	Neil Corbould, Hal Hickel, John Knoll and Mohen Leo	Won	
Teen Choice Awards	August 13, 2017	Choice Sci-Fi Movie	Rogue One	Nominated	
Teen Choice Awards	August 13, 2017	Choice Sci-Fi Movie Actor	Diego Luna	Nominated	
Teen Choice Awards	August 13, 2017	Choice Sci-Fi Movie Actress	Felicity Jones	Nominated	
Visual Effects Society Awards	February 7, 2017	Outstanding Visual Effects in a Photoreal Feature	Neil Corbould, Erin Dusseault, Hal Hickel, John Knoll and Nigel Sumner	Nominated	
Visual Effects Society Awards	February 7, 2017	Outstanding Animated Performance in a Photoreal Feature	"Grand Moff Tarkin" – Cyrus Jam, Sven Jensen, Jee Young Park and Steve Walton	Nominated	
Visual Effects Society Awards	February 7, 2017	Outstanding Created Environment in a Photoreal Feature	"Scarif Complex" – Enrico Damm, Yanick Dusseault, Kevin George and Olivier Vernay-Kim	Nominated	
Visual Effects Society Awards	February 7, 2017	Outstanding Virtual Cinematography in a Photoreal Project	"Space Battle" – Steve Ellis, Barry Howell, Euising Lee and John Levin	Nominated	
Visual Effects Society Awards	February 7, 2017	Outstanding Model in a Photoreal or Animated Project	"Princess Leia" – Paul Giacoppo, Gareth Jensen, James Tooley and Todd Vaziri	Nominated	
Visual Effects Society Awards	February 7, 2017	Outstanding Model in a Photoreal or Animated Project	"Star Destroyer" – Marko Chulev, Steven Knipping, Jay Machado and Akira Orikasa	Nominated	
Visual Effects Society Awards	February 7, 2017	Outstanding Effects Simulations in a Photoreal Feature	"Jedha Destruction" – Luca Mignardi, Ciaran Moloney, Matt Puchala and Miguel Perez Senent	Nominated	

== TV series ==
On November 8, 2018, it was announced that a live-action prequel series was officially in development and set to air on Disney's streaming service, Disney+. The series takes place five years before the events in Rogue One and focuses on Cassian Andor with Diego Luna reprising the role. The first season debuted on September 21, 2022, and focuses on Cassian's involvement in the Rebellion. The second and final season debuted on April 22, 2025, with its series finale released on May 13. Streaming of Rogue One saw a boost coinciding with the release and conclusion of the series.
