= Reynisdrangar =

Basalt sea stacks in southern Iceland

Coordinates: 63.3993°N 19.0319°W

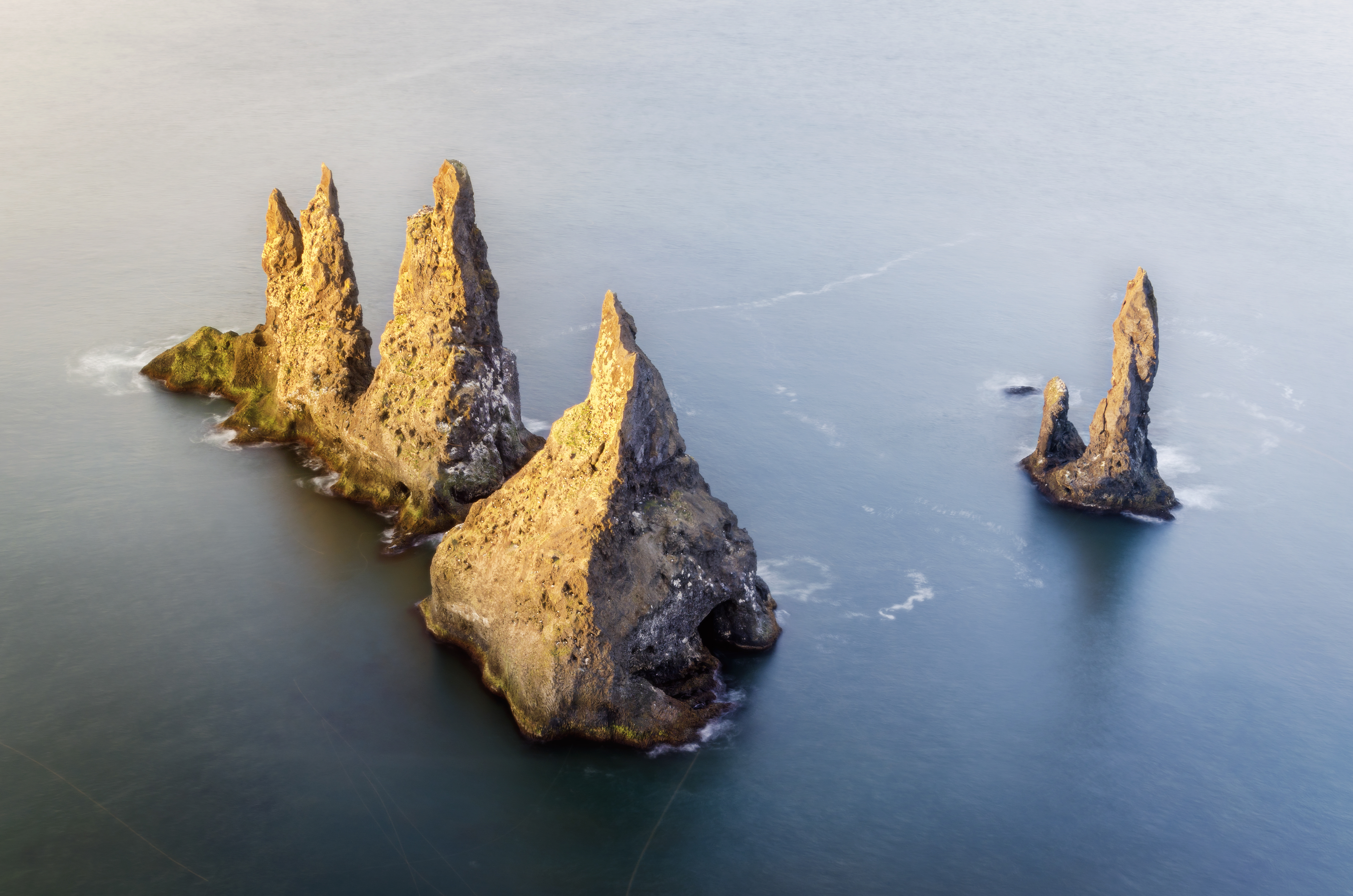
Reynisdrangar captured from Reynisfjall

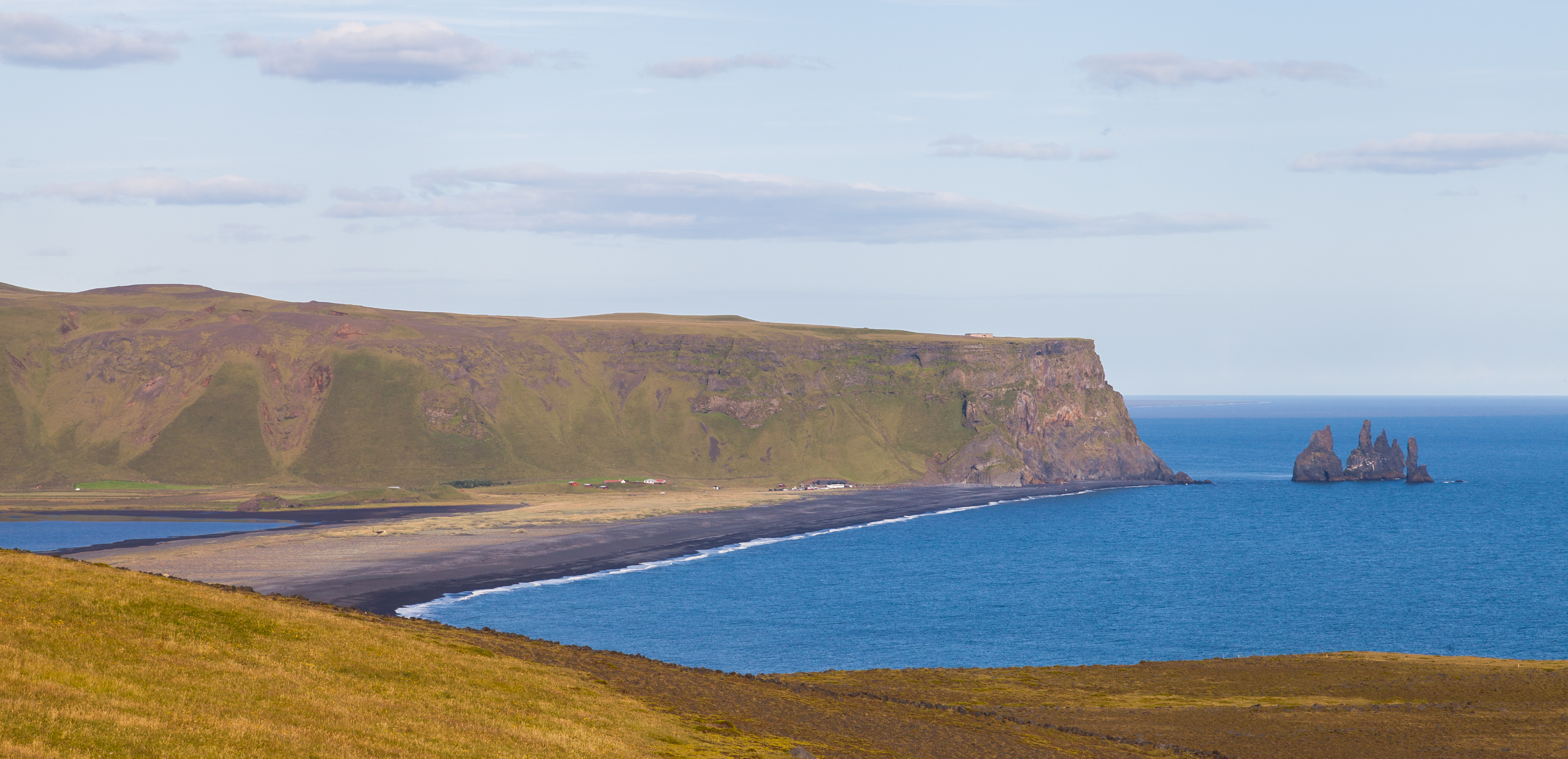
Landscape with the sea stacks in the background.

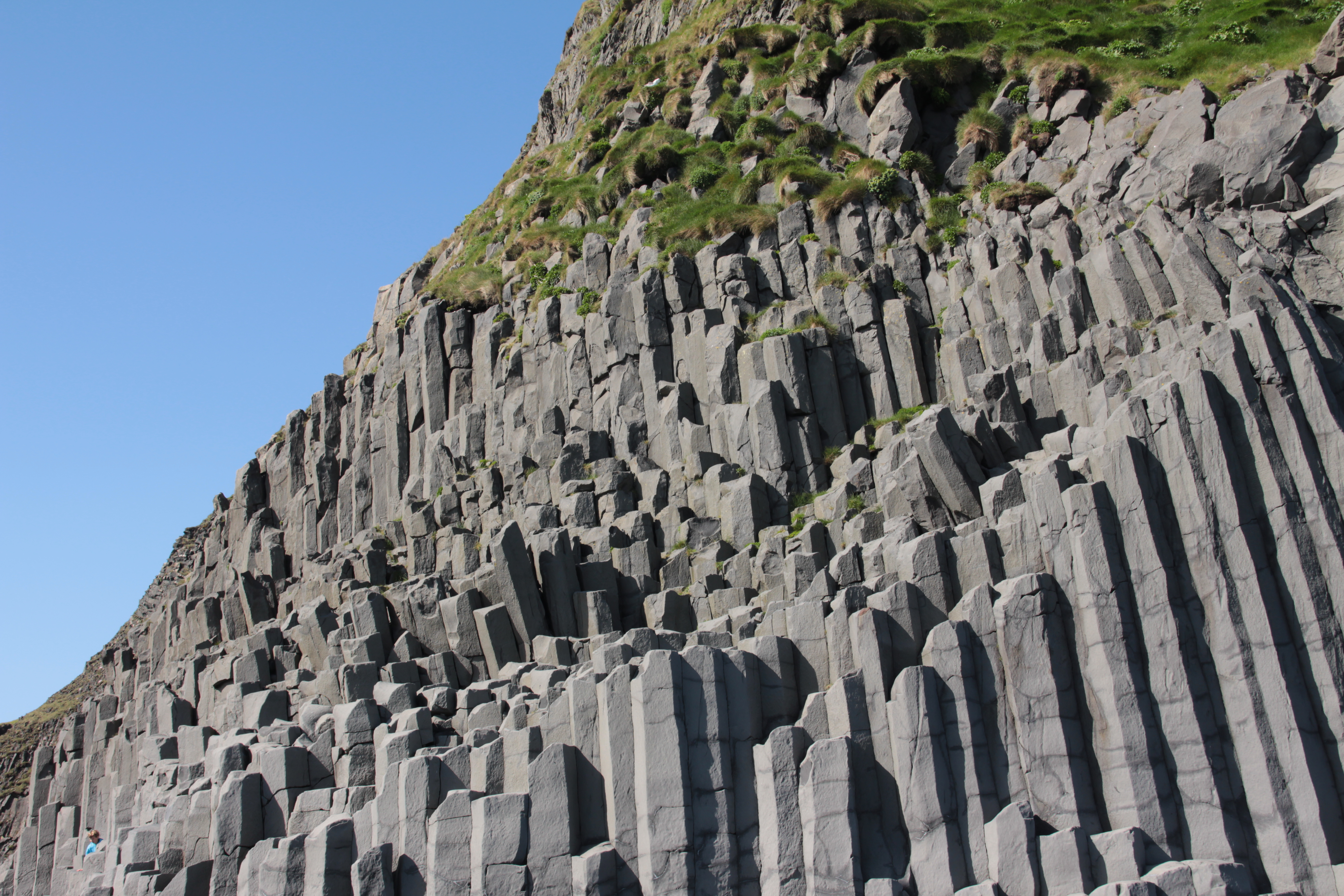
Basalt columns on the beach at Reynisfjara.

Reynisdrangar (Icelandic pronunciation: [ˈreiːnɪsˌtrauŋkar̥]) are the basalt sea stacks situated under the mountain Reynisfjall [ˈreiːnɪsˌfjatl̥] near the village of Vík í Mýrdal in southern Iceland. It is framed by a black sand beach that was ranked in 1991 as one of the ten most beautiful non-tropical beaches in the world. In 2021 Reynisfjara [ˈreiːnɪsˌfjaːra] was rated the sixth best beach in the world.

== Legend ==
Legend says that the stacks originated when two trolls dragged a three-masted ship to land unsuccessfully and at the break of day turned into needles of rock.

Contemporary legends note the story of a husband who found his wife taken frozen, having been abducted by the two trolls at night. The husband made the two trolls swear to never kill anyone ever again. His wife was the love of his life, whose free spirit he was unable to provide a home for; she found her fate out among the trolls, rocks, and sea at Reynisfjara.

== In popular culture ==
Reynisdrangar appears several times throughout Netflix's Icelandic original series Katla, and is particularly significant to the series' protagonist Gríma as the site of her mother's death.

== See also ==
- List of places with columnar jointed volcanics#Iceland
