= Jan M. Vevatne =

Norwegian politician

Jan Martin Vevatne (born 27 January 1950) is a former Norwegian politician for the Liberal Party.

He grew up in Sola Municipality, and graduated from Volda Teachers' College in 1972. He then moved to Asker where he worked as a school teacher until 1986. He worked as a consultant and with banking before becoming organizational leader in the Norwegian Society for the Conservation of Nature from 1992 to 2007. In 2007 he was hired in the Union of Education Norway.

He was a member of the municipal council of Asker Municipality from 1974 to 2003 and on the Akershus county council from 1991 to 2003. In 2000, during Bondevik's First Cabinet, he served as a political advisor in the Ministry of Transport. He served as a deputy representative to the Parliament of Norway during the term 1997–2001, and met for eight days of parliamentary session.

He lives in Gullhella. His wife Ingvild Tautra Vevatne was deputy mayor in Asker from 2003 to 2007.
