= List of films and television series set in Palm Springs, California =

This is a list of films and TV series set in Palm Springs, California. It covers topical settings and storyline subjects set in Palm Springs and other nearby resort communities of the Coachella Valley. These communities, which include Palm Springs, Bermuda Dunes, Cathedral City, Coachella, Desert Hot Springs, Indian Wells, Indio, La Quinta, Mecca, Palm Desert, Rancho Mirage, and the Salton Sea, are in Riverside County, southern California. Included are individual episodes of TV series.

== Films ==
=== 1930s ===
- Lucky Dog – 1933 film
- Palm Springs (a.k.a. Palm Springs Affair) – 1936 film
- Screen Snapshots – 1924–1958 short films
  - Series 15, No. 7 (1936)
  - Series 16, No. 6 (1937)
  - Series 17, No. 5 (1938)
- Sunkist Stars at Palm Springs – 1936 film
- Three Wise Guys – 1936 film

=== 1940s ===
- Flight to Nowhere – 1946 film
- The Glass Alibi – 1946 film
- Hedda Hopper's Hollywood – 1941–1942 short subjects
- High Sierra – 1941 film
- Hollywood Newsreel – 1946 film (episode: "Hollywood Stars and the Palm Springs Parade")
- Passkey to Danger – 1946 film
- The Saint in Palm Springs – 1941 film
- Yokel Boy – 1942 film

=== 1950s ===
- 711 Ocean Drive – 1950 film
- The Big Bluff – 1955 film
- D.O.A. – 1950 film
- Drive a Crooked Road – 1954 film
- Jet Pilot – 1957 film
- Mr. Imperium – 1951 film
- Star Studded Ride – 1954 short film
- The Monster That Challenged the World – 1957 film

=== 1960s ===
- The Cool Ones – 1967 film
- Eegah (a.k.a. Eegah! The Name Written in Blood) – 1962 film
- Happy – 1960–1961 television series
- Looney Tunes – 1930–1969 cartoon series
  - The Abominable Snow Rabbit (1961)
  - Music Mice-tro (1967)
- Palm Springs Weekend – 1963 film
- The Restless Ones – 1965 film
- Strangers When We Meet – 1960 film

=== 1970s ===
- Kotch – 1971 film

=== 1980s ===
- Less than Zero – ending scenes of the 1987 film based on the novel by Bret Easton Ellis
- Daffy Duck's Quackbusters – 1988 film
- Fraternity Vacation – 1985 film
- A Masterpiece of Murder – 1986 film
- Pee-wee's Big Adventure – 1985 comedy (scenes at the Cabazon Dinosaurs near Cabazon)
- Rockin' the Night Away – 1988 music DVD
- Screenplay – 1984 gay pornographic video
- Slow Burn – 1986 TV film

=== 1990s ===
- After Dark, My Sweet – 1990 film
- Betty – 1997 film
- Camp Fear – 1991 direct-to-video film
- City of Industry – 1997 film
- Dead Silence (a.k.a. A Death in Palm Springs) – 1997 film
- Fugitive Nights: Danger in the Desert – 1993 film
- Grace of My Heart – 1996 film
- I'll Love You Forever ... Tonight – 1992 film
- Mirage – 1995 film
- Play Time – 1995 film
- Poodle Springs – 1998 film
- The Rat Pack – 1998 TV film
- Round Trip to Heaven – 1992 film
- Still Kicking: The Fabulous Palm Springs Follies – 1997 short documentary film

=== 2000s ===
- Alpha Dog – 2007 film
- The Aviator – 2004 film
- Bonneville – 2006 film
- Bounce – 2000 film
- Cat City – 2009 film
- Circuit – 2001 film
- Coachella: The Film – 2006 documentary about the Coachella Valley Music and Arts Festival in Indio
- Dog Tags – 2008 film
- The Eyes of Tammy Faye – 2000 documentary
- Fuel – 2008 film (documentary)
- Gay Getaways (episodes 1–4: L.A. to Palm Springs) – 2007 DVD hosted by Greg Osborne
- Harley-Davidson: The Spirit of America – 2005 film (documentary)
- Home – 2009 film (documentary by Yann Arthus-Bertrand)
- Into the Wild – 2007 film
- Jerks – 2000 film
- Laughing Matters: The Men – 2008 DVD with Bruce Vilanch and Alec Mapa
- Party in Progress Vol. 2: Palm Springs – 2002 VHS
- Phat Girlz – 2006 film
- Plagues & Pleasures on the Salton Sea – 2004 documentary (Salton Sea)
- Raise Your Voice – 2004 film (Palm Desert)
- The Salton Sea – 2002 film (Mecca (Box Canyon and Painted Canyon) and the Salton Sea)
- Slumber Party – 2005 DVD
- Third World California – 2006 documentary (Lower Coachella Valley)
- Visual Acoustics: The Modernism of Julius Shulman – 2009 film
- When Boys Fly – 2002 documentary

=== 2010s ===
- About Fifty – 2011 film
- Apocalypse, CA – 2011 film
- Bombay Beach – 2010 documentary (Bombay Beach, California)
- Desert Utopia: Mid-Century Architecture in Palm Springs – 2010/2011 documentary
- Eating Out 5: The Open Weekend – 2012 film
- Encore of Tony Duran – 2011 film
- Good Luck Charlie, It's Christmas! – 2011 film
- Joan Rivers: A Piece of Work – 2010 documentary
- Little Birds – 2012 film set in the Salton Sea
- Pink Squirrels – 2011 film

=== 2020s ===
- Palm Springs – 2020 film
- Senior Moment - 2021 film

== Television and radio ==
=== 1940s ===
- Abbott and Costello
  - "Trip to Palm Springs" (radio) – December 2, 1943
- The Jack Benny Program (also broadcast as The Jack Benny Show) – 1932–1965 radio and TV series
  - "Climb to Taquitz Falls" (radio) – March 2, 1941
  - "Murder at the Racquet Club" (radio) – March 9, 1941 (with Charles Farrell and Charles Butterworth)
  - "Palm Springs' Prices" (radio) – March 16, 1941
  - "Going After Rommel" (radio) – November 29, 1942, with the 21st Ferrying Command.
  - "From Torney Hospital in Palm Springs" (radio) – April 8, 1945 (with William Powell)
  - "Desert Sketch" (radio) – April 22, 1945 (from the 29 Palms Naval Air Station)
  - "From Palm Springs California" (radio) – February 10, 1946 (with Eddie Cantor)
  - "Palm Springs Shopping" (radio) – February 24, 1946 (with Gilbert Seides)
  - "From Palm Springs California" (radio) – February 22, 1948 (with Frank Sinatra)
  - "From Palm Springs California" (radio) – April 11, 1948 (with Charles Farrell and Paul Lukas)
  - "Murder at the Racquet Club" (radio) – April 19, 1948

=== 1950s ===
- The Bob Cummings Show – 1955–1959 TV series
  - Season 4, Episode 32, "Grandpa's Old Buddy" (1958)
- The Bob Hope Show (radio) – March 11, 1952
- The Charles Farrell Show – 1956 TV series
- Date with the Angels – 1956–1957 TV series
  - Season 1, Episode 8, "Little White Lie" (1957)
- The Frank Sinatra Timex Show – 1957–1960 TV series
  - Season 2, Episode 2, "You're invited to spend the afternoon at the Frank Sinatra Show" (1959)
- General Electric Theater – 1953–1962 TV series
  - Season 3, Episode 30, "Into the Night" (1955)
- The George Burns and Gracie Allen Show – 1950–1958 TV series
  - Season 1, Episode 9, "To Go or Not to Go" (a.k.a. "Live Show #9") (1951)
  - Season 2, Episode 12, "Trip to Palm Springs" (1952)
  - Season 3, Episode 25, "Gracie Reports Car Stolen" (1953)
  - Season 7, Episode 21, "Going to Palm Springs" (1957)
- I Love Lucy – 1951–1957 TV series
  - Season 4, Episode 26, "In Palm Springs" (1955)
- It's a Great Life – 1954–1956 TV series
  - Season 2, Episode 33, "The Palm Springs Story" (1956)
- The Jack Benny Program (also broadcast as The Jack Benny Show) – 1932–1965 radio and TV series
  - "From Palm Springs California" (radio) – March 26, 1950 (with Bob Hope and The Guadalajara Trio)
  - "From Palm Springs California" (radio) – April 2, 1950 (with Al Jolson and Connie Barlow)
  - "How Palm Springs Was Founded" (radio) – February 11, 1951 (at the American Legion Hall)
  - "Palm Springs Murder Mystery" (radio – AFRS rebroadcast) – December 9, 1951
  - "Jack Renews His Driver's License" (radio) – December 16, 1951
  - "Palm Springs Steak Ride" (radio) – February 8, 1953
  - "How Palm Springs Was Founded" (radio) – March 15, 1953 (included Mel Blanc's Mexican gag)
  - "Steak Ride in Desert" (radio – AFRS rebroadcast) – May 24, 1953
  - "Golf Game – Discovery of Palm Springs" (radio – AFRS rebroadcast) – June 29, 1953
  - "To Palm Springs without Polly" (radio) – December 6, 1953
  - "Christmas Show from Palm Springs" (radio) – December 13, 1953
  - "Preparing for Palm Springs Vacation" (radio – AFRS rebroadcast) – May 10, 1954
  - "Preparing for Palm Springs" (also titled "In Palm Springs") (radio) – December 12, 1954
  - "Christmas at Palm Springs" (radio) – December 19, 1954
  - Season 6, Episode 13, "Jack Drives To Palm Springs" (1956)
- The People's Choice – 1955–1958 TV series
  - Season 2, Episode 16, "Sock's Master Plan" (1957)
- Person to Person – 1953–1961 TV series
  - Season 5, Episode 17, (January 3, 1958)
- The Phil Silvers Show – 1955–1959 TV series
  - Season 2, Episode 34, "The Colonel Breaks Par" (1957)
- Studio 57 – 1954–1956 TV series
  - Season 3, Episode 6, "Palm Springs Incident" (1956)

=== 1960s ===
- The Andy Williams Show – 1959–1971 TV series
  - Season 4, Episode 19, (March 21, 1966)
- The Beverly Hillbillies – 1962–1971 TV series
  - Season 1, Episode 4, "The Clampetts Meet Mrs. Drysdale" (1962)
- Good Morning World – 1967–1968 TV series
  - Season 1, Episode 10, "Feet of Clay and a Head to Match" (1967)
  - Season 1, Episode 17, "First Down and 200 Miles to Go" (1968)
- Happy – 1960–1961 TV series
- I Spy – 1965–1968 TV series
  - Season 2, Episode 1, "So Coldly Sweet" (1966)
  - Season 2, Episode 8, "Will the Real Good Guys Please Stand Up?" (1966)
- The Jack Benny Program (also broadcast as The Jack Benny Show) – 1932–1965 radio and TV series
  - Season 15, Episode 21, "Rainy Day in Palm Springs" (1965)
- The Lucy Show – 1962–1968 TV series
  - Season 5, Episode 8, "Lucy and Carol [Burnett] in Palm Springs" (1966)
- Mannix – 1967–1975 TV series
  - Season 1, Episode 1, "The Name is Mannix" (1967)
- Mayberry R.F.D. – 1968–1971 TV series
  - Season 2, Episode 10, "Palm Springs, Here We Come" (1969)
  - Season 2, Episode 11, "Palm Springs, Here We Are" (1969)
  - Season 2, Episode 12, "Millie and the Palm Springs Golf Pro" (1969)
  - Season 2, Episode 13, "Palm Springs Cowboy" (1969)
- The Merv Griffin Show – 1962–1963, 1965–1986 TV series
  - Season 4, Episode 169, (April 27, 1967)
  - Season 4, Episode 170, (April 28, 1968)
- My Favorite Martian – 1963–1966 TV series
  - Season 2, Episode 29, "Uncle Martin's Bedtime Story" (1965)
- Pete and Gladys – 1960–1962 TV series
  - Season 1, Episode 14, "Misplaced Weekend" (1960)
- The Rocky and Bullwinkle Show – 1959–1964 animated cartoon series

=== 1970s ===
- City of Angels – 1976 TV series
  - Season 1, Episode 7, "Palm Springs Answer" (1976)
- Here's Lucy – 1968–1974 TV series
  - Season 3, Episode 17, "Lucy's Vacation" (1971)
- Columbo - 1972–1994 TV series
  - Season 1, Episode 6, "Short Fuse" (1972)
- Lou Grant – 1977–1982 TV series
  - Season 2, Episode 20, "Convention" (1979)

=== 1980s ===
- It's a Living – 1980–1982 and 1985–1989) TV series
  - Season 4, Episode 10, "Critic's Choice" (1986)
- L.A. Law – 1986–1994 TV series
  - Season 2, Episode 9, "Divorce with Extreme Prejudice" (1987)
  - Season 5, Episode 18, "As God Is My Co-Defendant" (1991)
  - Season 6, Episode 19, "Silence of the Lambskins" (1992)
- Murder, She Wrote – 1984–1996 TV series
  - Season 6, Episode 4, "The Error of Her Ways" (1989)
- Too Close for Comfort – 1980–1986 TV series
  - Season 5, Episode 8, "The Two Faces of Muriel" (1985)
- The Tracey Ullman Show – 1987–1990 TV series
  - Season 3, Episode 20, "D.U.I." (1989)

=== 1990s ===
- Behind the Music – 1997– TV documentary series
  - Season 1, Episode 14, "Sonny Bono" (1998)
- Beverly Hills, 90210 – 1990–2000 TV series
  - Season 1, Episode 11, "B.Y.O.B." (1991)
  - Season 1, Episode 15, "A Fling in Palm Springs" (1991)
  - Season 4, Episode 21, "Addicted to Love" (1994)
  - Season 5, Episode 31, "P.S. I Love You: Part 1" (1994)
  - Season 5, Episode 32, "P.S. I Love You: Part 2" (1994)
  - Season 6, Episode 19, "Nancy's Choice" (1996)
  - Season 7, Episode 21, "Straight Shooter" (1997)
- California's Gold – 1990– TV series with Huell Howser Productions in association with KCET/Los Angeles
    1. 207 "Preserving the Past" (1991) (featuring bird songs of the Cahuilla people
  - Season 7, Episode 4, "Mt. San Jacinto"
- Comic Strip Live – 1989–1994 TV series
  - Season 1, Episode 7, "Palm Springs" (1991)
- Doogie Howser, M.D. – 1989–1993 TV series
  - Season 1, Episode 10, "My Old Man and the Sea" (1989)
  - Season 3, Episode 22, "Son of the Desert" (1992)
- The Fresh Prince of Bel-Air – 1990–1996 TV series
  - Season 1, Episode 6, "Mistaken Identity" (1990)
- Good Morning America – 1975– TV series
  - Season 18, Episode 223, (November 11, 1992)
- Hot Springs Hotel – 1997 Showtime adult comedy series (Desert Hot Springs)
- Kate Clinton: The Queen of Comedy – 1996 VHS taped at The Girl Bar during the Club Skirts Dinah Shore Weekend, included Maggie Cassella
- L.A. Doctors – 1998–1999 TV series
  - Season 1, Episode 24, "Forty-Eight Minutes" (1999)
- Lea DeLaria: The Queen of Comedy – 1997 VHS taped at The Girl Bar during the 7th Club Skirts Dinah Shore Weekend
- Melrose Place – 1992–1999 TV series
  - Season 1, Episode 30, "Carpe Diem" (1993)
  - Season 4, Episode 16, "Holy Strokes" (1996)
  - Season 5, Episode 28, "All Beths Are Off" (also called "Un-Janed Melody") (1997)
- P.S. I Luv U – 1991–1992 TV series
  - Season 1, Episode 1, "Pilot" (1991)
  - Season 1, Episode 2, "Smile, You're Dead" (1991)
  - Season 1, Episode 3, "The Honeymooners" (1991)
  - Season 1, Episode 4, "No Thanks for the Memories" (1991)
  - Season 1, Episode 5, "Diamonds Are a Girl's Worst Friend" (1991)
  - Season 1, Episode 6, "Unmarried... with Children" (1991)
  - Season 1, Episode 7, "What's Up, Bugsy?" (1991)
  - Season 1, Episode 8, "An Eye for an Eye" (1991)
  - Season 1, Episode 9, "Where There's a Will, There's a Dani" (1991)
  - Season 1, Episode 10, "I'd Kill to Direct" (1991)
  - Season 1, Episode 11, "There Goes the Neighborhood" (1991)
  - Season 1, Episode 12, "A Bundle of Trouble" (1992)
  - Season 1, Episode 13, "The Chameleon" (1992)
- Rescue 911 – 1980–1996 TV series
  - Season 6, Episode 18, "Chance Encounter" (1995)
- Saved by the Bell – 1989–1993 TV series
  - Season 3, Episode 18, "Palm Springs Weekend: Part 1" (1991)
  - Season 3, Episode 19, "Palm Springs Weekend: Part 2" (1991)
- Sonny Bono: Pop Songs & Politics – 1998 ABC News documentary

=== 2000s ===
- $40 a Day – 2002–2005 TV series
  - Season 2, Episode 15, "Palm Springs" (2003)
- 90210 – 2008– TV series
  - Season 1, Episode 13, "Love Me or Leave Me" (2009)
- America's Most Smartest Model – 2007 TV series
  - Season 1, Episode 10, "Hit Me with Your Best Shot" (2007)
  - Season 1, Episode 11, "Never Trust a Rottweiler" (2007)
- The Anna Nicole Show – 2002–2003 TV series
  - Season 2, Episode 10, "Anna (Palm) Springs into Action" (a.k.a. "Gimme a Spring Break") (2003)
- Antiques Roadshow – 1997– TV series
  - Season 13, Episode 1, "Palm Springs: Hour 1" (2009)
  - Season 13, Episode 2, "Palm Springs: Hour 2" (2009)
  - Season 13, Episode 3, "Palm Springs: Hour 3" (2009)
- Art Mann Presents – 2005– TV series
  - Season 1, Episode 2, "Palm Springs/NBA All-Star Mayhem" (2009)
- The Bachelor – 2002– U.S. TV series
  - Season 1, Episode 2, (2002)
  - Season 14, Episode 2 (2010)
- Bam's Unholy Union – 2007 TV series
  - Season 1, Episode 7, "Bam's Gone Wild" (2007)
  - Season 1, Episode 12, "Palm Springs" (2003)
- Boy Meets Boy – 2003 TV series
  - Season 1, Episode 1, "Boy Meets Boys and Overexuberant Host" (2003)
  - Season 1, Episode 2, "Where Have All The Possibly Straight Cowboys Gone?" (2003)
  - Season 1, Episode 3, "It's Raining Gay and Secretly Straight Men" (2003)
  - Season 1, Episode 4, "Yeah, But Do You LIKE Me?" (2003)
  - Season 1, Episode 5, "The Possibly Straight Cat's Out Of The Bag" (2003)
  - Season 1, Episode 6, "Finale" (2003)
- Bump! – 2004– TV series
  - Season 5, Episode 4, "Palm Springs" (2011)
- The Comeback – 2005 TV series
  - Season 1, Episode 8, "Valerie Relaxes in Palm Springs" (2005)
- Cops – 1989– TV series
  - Season 19, Episode 6, "Drug Arrests #2 Special Edition" (2006)
  - Season 19, Episode 24, "Coast to Coast #15" (2007)
- Destination Tennis – 2006– TV series
  - Season 1, Episode 4, "Palm Springs" (2007)
- Dirty Jobs – 2003– TV series
  - Season 3, Episode 28, "Aerial Tram Greaser" (2008)
  - Season 6, Episode 13, "Date Palm Pollinator" (2010)
- Dweezil & Lisa – 2004 TV series
  - Season 1, Episode 8, "Trip to L.A. and Palm Springs, CA" (2004)
- Eddie Griffin : Going for Broke – 2009 TV series
  - Season 1, Episode 6, "Going For Broke" (2009)
- Eisenhower & Lutz – 1988 TV series
  - Season 1, Episode 1, "The Whiplash Kid Returns (1)" (2008)
- Extreme Makeover: Home Edition – 2003–2012 TV series
  - Season 3, Episode 15, "The De'Aeth Family" (2006)
- Family Guy – 1999– animated TV series
  - Season 2, Episode 13, "Road to Rhode Island" (2000)
- Flavor of Love – 2006–2008 TV series
  - Season 1, Episode 7, "Flav's Trippin'" (2006)
- Flipping Out – 2007– Bravo TV series
  - Season 1, Episode 5, "The Inspector" (2007)
- Getaway – 1992– TV series
  - Season 15, Episode 10, (2006)
- Haunted Hotels – 2001–2005 TV series
  - Season 1, Episode 4, "Wandering Spirits" (2002)
- Hello Paradise – 2004– TV series
  - 81 episodes total (which include non-Palm Springs and desert episodes)
- Hidden Palms – 2007 TV series
  - Season 1, Episode 1, "Pilot" (2007)
  - Season 1, Episode 2, "Ghosts" (2007)
  - Season 1, Episode 3, "Party Hardy" (2007)
  - Season 1, Episode 4, "What Liza Beneath" (2007)
  - Season 1, Episode 5, "Mulligan" (2007)
  - Season 1, Episode 6, "Dangerous Liaisons" (2007)
  - Season 1, Episode 7, "Stand By Your Woman" (2007)
  - Season 1, Episode 8, "Second Chances" (2007)
- The Hills – 2006–2010 TV series
  - Season 4, Episode 20, "I Heidi Take Thee Spencer..." (2008)
- House Hunters – 1999– TV series
  - Season 15, Episode 1, "Palm Springs Dreamin'" (2005)
  - Season 40, Episode 10, "Vacation Home in Palm Springs" (2010)
  - Season 40, Episode 12, "Vacation Home in Palm Springs" (2010)
  - Season 44, Episode 8, "Settling Down in Los Angeles" (2012)
  - Season 74, Episode 9, "Couple Clashes Over Style in Palm Springs" (2013)
- Huff – 2004–2006 TV series
  - Season 2, Episode 4, "Sweet Release" (2006)
- I Love New York – 2007–2008 TV series
  - Season 1, Episode 8, "Gettin' Hot In The Desert" (2007)
- Intervention – 2005– TV series
  - Season 1, Episode 4, "Alissa/Brian" (2005)
- The Janice Dickinson Modeling Agency – 2006–2008 TV series
  - Season 1, Episode 6, "It's Official" (2006)
- Kathy Griffin: My Life on the D-List – 2005–2010 TV series
  - Season 5, Episode 10, "Kathy Is a Star...Kind Of" (2009)
  - Season 6, Episode 7, "Getting My House in Order" (2010)
- Kathy Griffin: stand up specials – 1996– television and DVDs
  - Kathy Griffin: Strong Black Woman (2006)
- The L Word – 2004–2009 TV series
  - Season 1, Episode 11, "Looking Back" (2004)
- A Lez in Wonderland – 2006 TV documentary
- Lost Worlds – 2005–2006 TV series
  - Season 2, Episode 5, "Secret U.S. Bunkers" (2007)
- Mad Men – 2007– TV series
  - Season 2, Episode 11, "The Jet Set" (2008)
- The Mentalist – 2008– TV series
  - Season 1, Episode 1, "Pilot" (2008)
- My Super Sweet 16 – 2005–2008 TV series
  - Season 6, Episode 2, "Kat" (2007)
- National Open House – 2006– HGTV series
  - Season 1, Episode HNOH-105, "Palm Springs, Philadelphia, Asheville" (2006)
  - Season 1, Episode HNOH-109, "New York, Missoula, Palm Springs" (2006)
  - Season 2, Episode HNOH-204, "Palm Springs, Moorestown, Austin" (2007)
  - Season 2, Episode HNOH-208, "Des Moines, Boston, Palm Springs" (2007)
- Newlyweds: Nick and Jessica – 2003–2005 TV series
  - Season 2, Episode 13, "Celebrity Issues" (2004)
- Newport Harbor: The Real Orange County – 2007–2008 MTV TV series
  - Season 1, Episode 101, "Crush...Interrupted" (2007)
- Notes from the Underbelly – 2007–2008 TV series
  - Season 2, Episode 7, "The List" (2008)
  - Season 2, Episode 9, "Baby on Board" (aired 2010)
- The O.C. – 2003– TV series
  - Season 1, Episode 16, "The Links" (2004)
- Palm Springs Week with Huell Howser – 2003–2011 TV series
- The Parkers – 1999–2003 TV series
  - Season 1, Episode 18, "It's a Spring Bling Thing" (2000)
- Private Practice – 2007– TV series
  - Season 5, Episode 13, "The Time Has Come" (2012)
- Property Ladder – 2005 TV series
  - Season 1, Episode 3, "Desert DIY Disaster" (2005)
- Real Chance of Love – 2008–2009 TV series
  - Season 1, Episode 9, "The Parent Trap, Part I" (2008)
- Road Rules – 1995–2007 TV series
  - Season 9 (Maximum Velocity Tour), Episode 21, "The Real World/Road Rules Casting Special" (2001)
- Samantha Brown's Great Weekends – 2008– TV series
  - Season 3, Episode 5, "Palm Springs" (2010)
- Scott Baio Is 46...and Pregnant
  - Season 1, Episode 3, "Commitment" (2008)
- Sell This House – 2003– TV series
  - Season 3, Episode 6, "Palm Springs, CA: Michael Trefun & Tom Mendel" (2005)
  - Season 5, Episode 24, "Palm Springs, CA: Tim & Andy" (2008)
  - Season 5, Episode 25, "Palm Springs, CA: Maria & Joe" (2008)
- SexTV – 1998–2008 TV series
  - Season 10, Episode 4, "Desert Shadows/Joe Gallant/A Naked Portrait: The Cowboy" (2007)
- Shootout – 2003–2008 TV series
  - Season 4, Episode 11, "Palm Springs Film Festival 2007 part 1" (2007)
  - Season 4, Episode 12, "Palm Springs Film Festival 2007 part 2" (2007)
  - Season 5, Episode 14, "Palm Springs Film Festival" (2008)
- Sons of Hollywood – 2007 TV series
  - Season 1, Episode 5, "Making of a Male Actor" (2007)
- Street Patrol – 2009 TV series
  - Season 2, Episode 24, "Palm Springs/Kansas City/Riviera Beach" (2009)
- The Surreal Life – 2003–2006 TV series
  - Season 2, Episode 5, "Nude Resort" (2004)
- Totally Spies! – 2001– TV series
  - Season 1, Episode 18, "Evil Boyfriend" (2002)
- Trading Spouses – 2004–2007 TV series
  - Season 3, Episode 4, "Solomon/Parodi (1)" (2006)
  - Season 3, Episode 5, "Solomon/Parodi (2)" (2006)
- Trista & Ryan's Wedding – 2003 ABC miniseries (at The Lodge luxury resort in Rancho Mirage)
- Untold Stories of the E.R. – 2005– TV series
  - Season 4, Episode 8, "Too Close to Home" (2006)
- The Wandering Golfer – 2004–2006 TV series
  - Season 1, Episode 13, "Palm Springs, California" (2005)
- Welcome to the Parker – 2007 TV series
  - Season 1, Episode 1, "Guess Who's Coming to (Criticize) Dinner?" (2007)
  - Season 1, Episode 2, "Let Them Eat Tarts" (2007)
  - Season 1, Episode 3, "Drag Queens and a Drama Queen" (2007)
  - Season 1, Episode 4, "The Business of Pleasure" (2007)
  - Season 1, Episode 5, "Making Up is Hard to Do" (2007)
  - Season 1, Episode 6, "Last Looks" (2007)
- Work Out – 2006–2008 TV series
  - Season 1, Episode 2, Episode 102, (2006)
  - Season 1, Episode 4, "Jackie's Away, Trainers Will Play" (2006)
  - Season 1, Episode 5, "Inner Strength" (2006)

=== 2010s ===
- 1000 Ways to Die – 2008– TV series
  - Season 3, Episode 25, "Death on a Stick" (2010)
- All About Aubrey – 2011 TV series
  - Season 1, Episode 4, "Single White Roommate" (2011)
- The Amazing Race – 2001– TV series
  - Season 18, Episode 1, "Head Down and Hold On: Australia" (2011)
- America's Next Top Model – 2003– TV series
  - Cycle 15, Episode 1, "Welcome to High Fashion" (2010)
- Auction Hunters – 2010– TV series
  - Season 3, Episode 13, "Hot Wheels" (2011)
- Audrina – 2011 TV series
  - Season 1, Episode 1, "This Is MY Reality" (2011)
- Beverly's Full House – 2011– Oprah Winfrey Network (OWN) TV series
- Chefs vs. City – 2009–2010 TV series
  - Season 2, Episode 10, "Palm Springs" (2010)
- Deadly Women – 2005– Discovery Channel series
  - Season 6, Episode 20, "Brides of Blood"
- Design School – 2010 HGTV series
  - Season 1, Episode HDSCH-109H, "Chase Hotel, Part 1" (2010)
  - Season 1, Episode HDSCH-110H, "Chase Hotel, Part 2" (2010)
- Extreme Homes – HGTV series
  - "Palm Springs Home" (2012)
- Forever Young – 2013– TV series
  - Season 1, Episode 4, "Party in Palm Springs" (2013)
- Hell's Kitchen – 2005– TV series
  - Season 9, Episode 9, (July 19, 2011)
- Life After People – 2009–2010 TV series
  - Season 2, Episode 6, "Holiday Hell" (2010)
- Martha – 2010– TV series (a.k.a. The Martha Stewart Show)
  - "The Palm Springs Show" (May 27, 2010)
- Men of a Certain Age – 2009–2011 TV series
  - Season 2, Episode 6, "Let the Sunshine In" (2011)
- Million Dollar Decorators – 2011 Bravo HD TV series
  - Season 1, Episode 7, "The Suite Life" (2011)
- Million Dollar Rooms – 2011–2012 HGTV series
  - Episode HMDRS-203HE, "Nature Filled Great Room" (2012)
- The Next Food Network Star – 2005– TV series
  - Season 6, Episode 6, "Retro Palm Springs" (2010)
- Off Limits – 2011– TV series
  - Season 2, Episode 7, "Digging for Sea Salt; Demolishing a Bridge; Atop a Tramway" (2012)
- On the Red Carpet – 2013– TV series
  - Episode 11, "From the Palm Springs International Film Festival" (2014)
- The Outdoor Room – HGTV series
  - "Mid-Century Outdoors" (2010)
- Pipe Dream – 2010 TV series
- Raising Whitley – 2013– TV series
  - Season 1, Episode 6, "Palm Springs Shimmy" (2013)
- The Real Housewives of Atlanta – 2008– TV series
  - Season 3, Episode 2, "Model Behavior" (2010)
  - Season 3, Episode 3, "White Hot" (2010)
- The Real Housewives of Orange County – 2006– TV series
  - Season 5, Episode 13, "Let's Bow Our Heads and Pray" (2010)
  - Season 6, Episode 3, "A New Lease On Life" (2011)
- The Real L Word – 2010– TV series
  - Season 1, Episode 9, "Dinah Or Bust" (2010)
- "Desert Flippers" - 2016 - HGTV TV series

=== 2020s ===
- Mid-Century Modern, 2025 Hulu Television Sit-com

== See also ==
- List of films shot in Palm Springs, California
- List of films shot in Riverside, California
- List of years in film
- List of years in radio
- List of years in television
- Palm Springs in popular culture

== References and notes ==
- "Old Palm Springs Movies" (2001), California's Gold /#0004. VHS videorecording by Huell Howser Productions, in association with KCET/Los Angeles. OCLC 47979410
