= List of films shot in Palm Springs, California =

This is a list of films and television programs shot in Palm Springs, California. It covers filming locations in Palm Springs and other nearby resort communities of the Coachella Valley. These communities, which include Palm Springs, Bermuda Dunes, Cathedral City, Coachella, Desert Hot Springs, Indian Wells, Indio, La Quinta, Mecca, Thermal, Palm Desert, Rancho Mirage, and the Salton Sea, are in Riverside County, southern California. Included are individual episodes of TV series and radio programs.

== Films ==
=== 1910s ===
In his 1919 book California Desert Trails, travel writer J. Smeaton Chase mentions that motion-picture people were in the Indian Canyons sometime before 1918.

- Salomé – 1918 film
- The Heir to the Hoorah – 1916 film (starring Thomas Meighan, directed by William C. deMille)
- The Lone Star Ranger – 1919 film (starring William Farnum and Louise Lovely)
- The Lone Star Rush – 1915 film (starring Robert Frazer)

=== 1920s ===
- Desert Gold – 1926 film
- The Covered Wagon – 1922 film
- The Leopard Woman – 1920 film
- The Orphan – 1920 film
- The Sheik – 1921 film

=== 1930s ===
- Her Jungle Love – 1938 film
- Lost Horizon (a.k.a. Lost Horizon of Shangri-La) – 1937 film
- Palm Springs (a.k.a. Palm Springs Affair) – 1936 film
- Screen Snapshots – 1924–1958 short films
  - Series 15, No. 7 (1936)
  - Series 16, No. 6 (1937)
  - Series 17, No. 5 (1938)
- Springtime in the Rockies – 1937 film
- Sunkist Stars at Palm Springs – 1936 film
- The Painted Stallion – 1937 film
- They Made Me a Criminal – 1939 film
- Under Two Flags – 1936 film (also in La Quinta)
- Whoopee! – 1930 film

=== 1940s ===
- A Night in Casablanca – 1946 film
- Girl Crazy (a.k.a. When the Girls Meet the Boys) – 1943 film
- Hedda Hopper's Hollywood – 1941–1942 short subjects
- In the Navy – 1941 film
- Objective, Burma! – 1945 film
- Rio Rita – 1942 film
- Sahara – 1943 film
- Song of the Open Road – 1944 film
- The Threat – 1949 film
- The Time, the Place and the Girl – 1946 film
- To the Shores of Tripoli – 1942 film
- Two Guys from Texas – 1948 film
- Wake Island – 1942 film

=== 1950s ===
- 711 Ocean Drive – 1950 film
- Highway Dragnet – 1954 film
- Omar Khayyam – 1957 film
- Raw Edge – 1956 film
- Star Studded Ride – 1954 short film
- Ten Tall Men – 1951 film
- The Beast with a Million Eyes – 1955 film
- The Damned Don't Cry! – 1950 film
- The Desert Rats – 1953 film
- The Monster That Challenged the World – 1957 film
- The Silver Chalice – 1954 film
- The Veils of Bagdad – 1953 film

=== 1960s ===
- Blood of Dracula's Castle – 1969 film
- Common Law Cabin – 1967 film
- Eegah (a.k.a. Eegah! The Name Written in Blood) – 1962 film
- Palm Springs Weekend – 1963 film
- Tell Them Willie Boy Is Here – 1969 film
- The Professionals – 1966 film
- The Rare Breed – 1966 film
- The Satan Bug – 1965 film
- The Wild Angels – 1966 film
- The Wrecking Crew – 1969 film

=== 1970s ===
- 3 Women – 1977 film
- Damnation Alley – 1977 film
- Diamonds Are Forever – 1971 film
- Gone with the Pope – 1976 film, released in 2010
- Hanging by a Thread – 1979 film
- Institute for Revenge – 1979 TV movie
- Kotch – 1971 film
- The Doll Squad – 1974 film

=== 1980s ===
- American Gigolo – 1980 film
- Fraternity Vacation – 1985 film
- Heaven – 1987 film
- Less than Zero – 1987 film
- Lethal Weapon 2 – 1989 film
- Pee-wee's Big Adventure – 1985 comedy (at the Cabazon Dinosaurs near Cabazon)
- Rain Man – 1988 film
- Rockin' the Night Away – a 1988 music DVD
- Screenplay – 1984 film
- Tough Guys – 1986 film

=== 1990s ===
- Bugsy – 1991 film
- City of Industry – 1997 film
- Joshua Tree (a.k.a. Army of One) – 1993 film
- Pacific Heights – 1990 film
- Road Kill – 1999 film
- Six-String Samurai – 1998 film
- Still Kicking: The Fabulous Palm Springs Follies – 1997 short documentary film
- Terminal Velocity – 1994 film
- The Moment After – 1999 film
- The Opposite of Sex – 1998 film
- U Turn (a.k.a. U Turn – ici commence l'enfer) – 1997 film

=== 2000s ===
- Alpha Dog – 2007 film
- American High School – 2009 direct-to-DVD
- Andrew and Jeremy Get Married – 2004 documentary film
- Auto Focus – 2002 film
- Bone Dry – 2007 film
- Bounce – 2000 film
- Circuit – 2001 film
- Dog Tags – 2008 film
- Dream Slashers – 2007 direct-to-DVD
- Home – 2009 film (documentary by Yann Arthus-Bertrand)
- Into the Wild – 2007 film
- Laughing Matters: The Men – 2008 DVD with Bruce Vilanch and Alec Mapa
- Love Life – 2006 film
- Mission: Impossible III – 2006 film
- Ocean's Eleven – 2001 film
- Overnight – 2003 film
- Phat Girlz – 2006 film
- Poster Boy – 2004 film
- Searchers 2.0 – 2007 film
- Soarin' Over California – 2001 film (part of a visitor attraction at Disneyland)
- The Eyes of Tammy Faye – 2000 documentary
- The Hoax – 2006 film
- The Princess and the Marine – 2001 film (also filmed in Indio)
- The Scorpion King – 2002 film
- Torque – 2004 film
- Trucker – 2007 film
- Visual Acoustics: The Modernism of Julius Shulman – 2009 film
- Wannabe – 2005 film

=== 2010s ===
- Behind the Candelabra – 2013 HBO film about Liberace
- Douchebag – 2010 film
- Joan Rivers: A Piece of Work – 2010 documentary
- Desert Utopia: Mid-Century Architecture in Palm Springs – 2010/2011 documentary
- Montana Amazon – 2011 film
- Senior Moment – 2017 film (in production)
- Tim and Eric's Billion Dollar Movie – 2012 film

=== 2020s ===
- Night Train – 2021 film.
- Don't Worry Darling – 2022 film.

== Television ==
- A Lez in Wonderland – 2006 TV documentary
- American Dream Builders – 2014 NBC TV series
- Average Joe – 2004 TV series
- Beverly's Full House – 2011– Oprah Winfrey Network (OWN) TV series
- Biker Build-Off – 2002–2007 TV series
- Bob Hope Television Specials – TV specials
  - Bob Hope Special: The Bob Hope Special from Palm Springs (February 13, 1978)
  - The Bob Hope Show (January 21, 1989)
  - Bob Hope's Yellow Ribbon Party (April 6, 1991)
  - Bob Hope Christmas Special: Hopes for the Holidays (1994)
- Boy Meets Boy – 2003 TV series
- Christy Lane's Line Dancing – 1992 VHS taped at Zelda's
- Columbo – 1968–2003 TV series
  - Season 1, Episode 6, "Short Fuse" (1971)
- Cops – 1989– TV series
  - Season 19, Episode 6, "Drug Arrests #2 Special Edition" (2006)
  - Season 19, Episode 24, "Coast to Coast #15" (2007)
- Downey – 1994 television talk show
- Gene Simmons Family Jewels – 2006– TV series
- Hart to Hart – 1979–1984 TV series (episode in La Quinta)
- Hello Paradise – 2004–2011 TV series
  - 81 episodes total (which include non-Palm Springs and desert episodes)
- Hidden Palms – 2006 pilot for the 2007 TV series
- I Love Lucy – 1951–1957 TV series (various episodes)
- I Spy – 1965–1968 TV series
- Kate Clinton: The Queen of Comedy – 1996 VHS taped at The Girl Bar during the Club Skirts Dinah Shore Weekend, included Maggie Cassella
- Kathy Griffin: My Life on the D-List – 2005–2010 TV series
- Lea DeLaria: The Queen of Comedy – 1997 VHS taped at The Girl Bar during the 7th Club Skirts Dinah Shore Weekend
- Louis Theroux's Weird Weekends – 1998–2000 TV series
  - Season 1, Episode 2, "UFO" (1998)
- Mannix – 1967–1975 TV series
  - Season 1, Episode 1, "The Name is Mannix" (1967)
- Martha – 2010– TV series (a.k.a. The Martha Stewart Show)
  - "The Palm Springs Show" (May 27, 2010)
- McMillan & Wife – 1971–1977 TV series
  - Season 1, Episode 5, "The Face of Murder" (1972)
- Miss California USA – 1989 TV show (for the 1990 Miss California Title)
- Mission: Impossible – 1966–1973 TV series
  - Season 6, Episode 3, "The Tram" (1971)
- Mrs. America Pageant – 2005 TV show (for the 2006 Mrs. America Title)
- Newlyweds: Nick and Jessica – 2003–2005 TV series
- Off Limits – 2011– TV series
  - Season 2, Episode 7, "Digging for Sea Salt; Demolishing a Bridge; Atop a Tramway" (2012)
- P.S. I Luv U – 1991–1992 TV series
- Rescue 911 – 1989–1996 TV series
  - Season 2, Episode 24, "5-Year-Old Dad Save" (1991, Palm Desert)
  - Season 6, Episode 18, "Chance Encounter" (1995)
- Since You've Been Gone – 1998 television film
- Slow Burn – 1986 television film
- Sonny Bono: Pop Songs & Politics – 1998 ABC News documentary
- Southland – 2009– TV series
  - Season 2, Episode 4, "The Runner" (2010)
- Tammy Faye: Death Defying – 2004 documentary
- The Bold and the Beautiful – 1987– TV series
- The Dating Game – 1965–1999 TV series
- The F.B.I. – 1965–1974 TV series
- The Frank Sinatra Timex Show – 1957–1960 TV series
  - Season 2, Episode 2, "You're invited to spend the afternoon at the Frank Sinatra Show" (1959)
- The Merv Griffin Show – 1963–1986 TV series (a 1960s special episode)
- Throwdown! with Bobby Flay – 2006–2009 TV series
- True Life – 1998– TV series
- Wheeler Dealers – 2003– TV series
- WWE Legends' House – 2012 TV series

=== Radio ===
The Amos 'n' Andy and The Jack Benny Program radio shows were frequently broadcast from Palm Springs; also, Eddie Cantor, Al Jolson, and Bob Hope broadcast from the city.

== Coachella Valley ==
- 2 Fast 2 Furious – 2003 film (Desert Hot Springs)
- After Dark, My Sweet – 1990 film (Mecca, California)
- America's Tribute to Bob Hope – 1988 documentary (Palm Desert)
- Beverly Hills, 90210 – 1990s TV series (1995 episodes in Rancho Mirage)
- Bombay Beach – 2010 documentary (Bombay Beach, California)
- Coachella: The Film – 2006 documentary about the Coachella Valley Music and Arts Festival in Indio
- Constantine – 2005 film (Eagle Mountain near Desert Center)
- Five Graves to Cairo – 1943 film (Indio)
- Hot Springs Hotel – 1997 Showtime adult comedy series (Desert Hot Springs) with Samantha Phillips
- I Shouldn't Be Alive – 2005– TV series (San Jacinto Mountains, 2010 episode)
- Impostor – 2001 film (Eagle Mountain near Desert Center)
- It's a Mad, Mad, Mad, Mad World – 1963 film (Palm Desert, Twentynine Palms, Yucca Valley and Palm Springs)
- Julie – 1956 film (Indio)
- Little Birds – 2012 film (the Salton Sea)
- Live from Baghdad – 2002 HBO television movie (Eagle Mountain near Desert Center)
- Plagues & Pleasures on the Salton Sea – 2004 documentary (the Salton Sea)
- Rita Rudner: Married Without Children – 1995 HBO performance (Palm Desert)
- River Monsters – 2013 Animal Planet promotional video (Bombay Beach)
- Satan's Sadists – 1969 outlaw biker film (Indio)
- The Beast with a Million Eyes – 1955 film (Coachella Valley)
- The Big Fisherman – 1959 film (La Quinta)
- The Bob Cummings Show – 1955–1959 TV series (portions filmed at the Rancho Las Palmas Country Club in Rancho Mirage)
- The Island – 2005 film (Eagle Mountain and Salton Sea)
- The Kid – 2000 film (Coachella Valley)
- The Long, Long Trailer – 1954 film (on the Pines to Palms Scenic Byway (State Route 74) in Palm Desert)
- The Player – 1992 film (Desert Hot Springs)
- The Salton Sea – 2002 film (Mecca (Box Canyon and Painted Canyon) and the Salton Sea)
- Third World California – 2006 documentary (Lower Coachella Valley)
- Torque – 2004 film (Blythe, Desert Hot Springs, Palm Desert)
- Trista & Ryan's Wedding – a 2003 ABC miniseries (The Lodge luxury resort in Rancho Mirage)
- Twentynine Palms – 2003 film (Twentynine Palms (Drifting Palms) and Coachella Valley)
- Two Guys from Texas – 1948 musical comedy (Rancho Mirage)
- Unknown – 2006 film (Eagle Mountain and Desert Center)

== See also ==
- List of films and TV series set in Palm Springs, California
- List of films shot in Riverside, California
- List of years in film
- List of years in radio
- List of years in television
- Palm Springs in popular culture
