= Aysanem Yusupova =

Uzbek actor

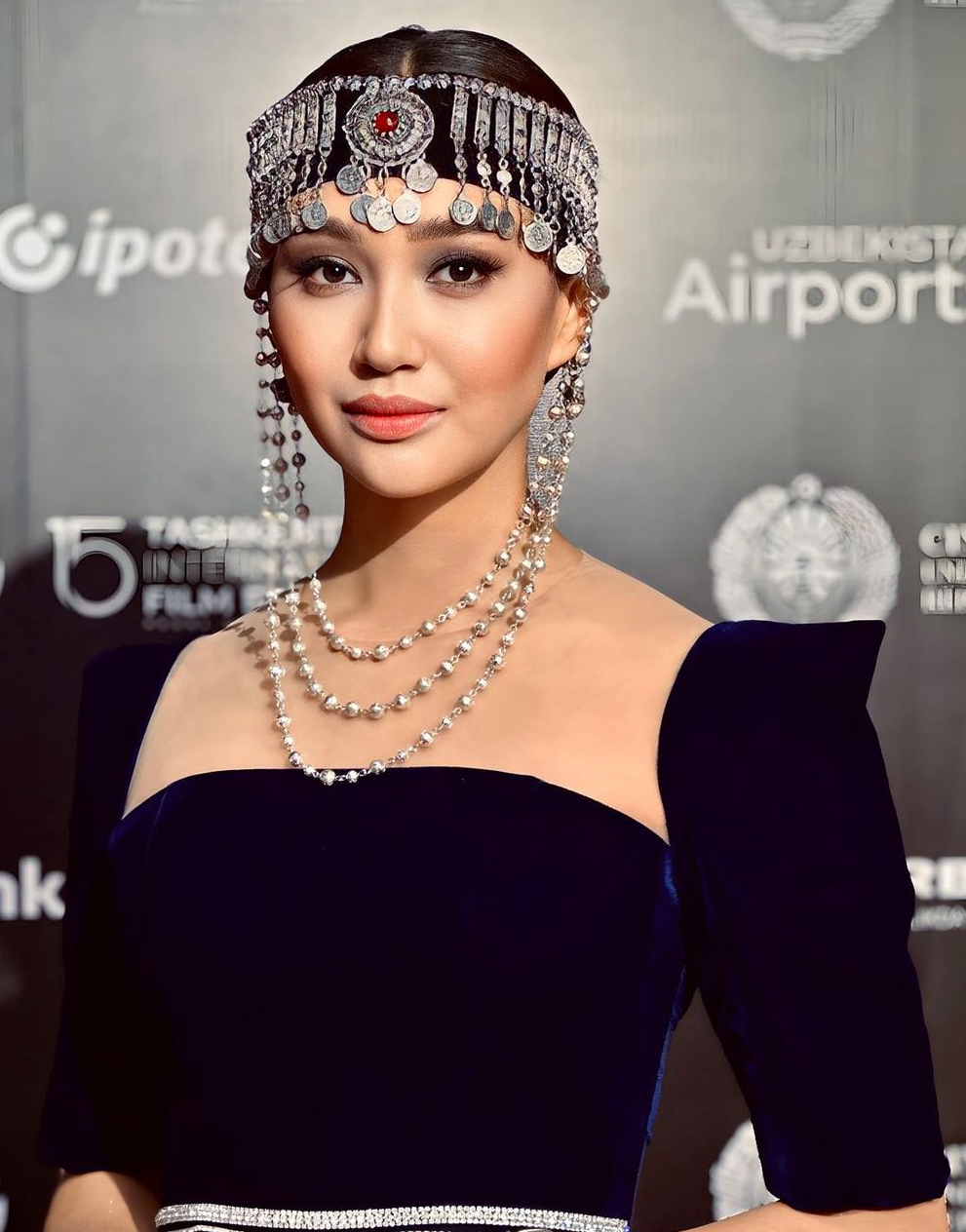
- Born: Aysanemxon Yusupova; January 2, 1997 (age 29); Nukus, Uzbekistan
- Education: Uzbekistan State Institute of Arts and Culture (Bachelor's degree 2016–2020); Uzbekistan State Institute of Arts and Culture (Master's degree 2020–2022)
- Occupation: Actress
- Years active: 2012–present
- Awards: Culture and Art Sacrifice 2023; Creator of the Future 2024

Aysanem Yusupova (Karakalpak: Aysanem Yusupova, Ойсанем Юсупова; Russian: Айсанем Юсупова) (born January 2, 1997) is a Karakalpak actress and presenter. Yusupova received widespread recognition and acclaim in Uzbekistan after starring in the 2017 Uzbek drama Meros. Since then she has starred in many Uzbek comedy films.

== Life ==
Aysanem Yusupova was born on January 2, 1997, in Nukus. After graduating from school in 2012, Yusupova studied at the Law Faculty of Nukus State University. After graduating from the university in 2016–2020, she entered the Department of Drama, Theater and Cinematic Acting of the State Institute of Arts and Culture of Uzbekistan. In 2020 she entered the Master's Department of the Institute of Art and Culture and graduated in 2022.

== Career ==
Yusupova started her career in 2012 with music videos and commercials. In 2012, she starred in several music videos and became popular in Uzbekistan. Yusupov's first major role was in the 2017 film Maftun boʻldim 2, which brought her great fame. Yusupova did not stop there; in 2018 she starred in the Uzbek film "Hayot", which also brought her luck, whereas the 2019 film "Ayriliq" did not.

This year 2021, Yusupova starred in the successful film "Meros". After a short hiatus, Yusupova's 2021 film Zaynab bilqn qoling begim also found success. From 2021 to 2022 she starred in several films and television series. Yusupova played one of the main characters in the 2023 Uzbek film "Oʻzbek qizi", which became very popular not only in Uzbekistan, but also in Belarus.

In 2023, with the role of the main character in the film "The Uzbek Girl" "For the best female role" at the IV International Film Festival "Lendok" held in the Russian Federation and at the I International Film Festival "Taji Somon" celebrated in the Republic. from Tajikistan won the nomination.

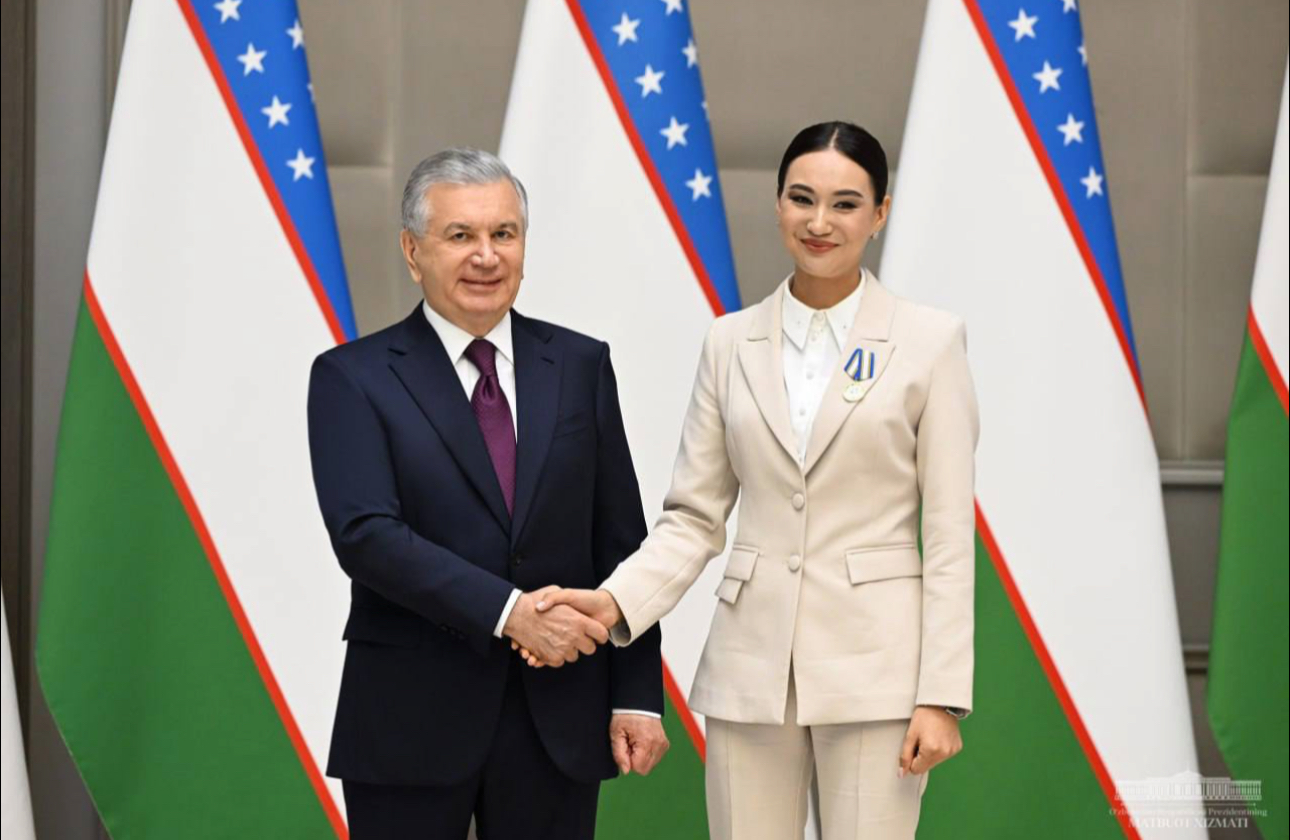
2024 Shavkat Mirziyoyev and Aysanem Yusupova at the award ceremony.

In July 2024 she received the state prize "Creator of the Future", created by the laureate of Uzbekistan Shavkat Mirziyoyev to support young artists of Uzbekistan.

In addition to roles in feature films, Yusupova also starred in music videos for several Uzbek singers, most notably Yorkinhoja's "Yomgir"

== Filmography ==
Below is a chronologically ordered list of films in which Aysanem Yusupova has appeared.

Year	English name	Original name	Role	Ref
2017	I was fascinated 2	Maftun boldim 2	Qizlargul	
2018	Life	Hayot	Lola	
2020	Heritage	Meros	Oygul	
2023	Uzbek girl	Oʻzbek qizi	Jamila	
2024	Pandemic	Pandemiya	Gulruh	
2024	Old girl	Qari qiz	Sitora	
2024	Sevdo	Sevdo	Sevdo	

=== TV serials ===
Year	Title	Role	Ref
2019	Ayriliq		
2021	Zaynab bilan qolin begim		
2022	Yolgiz qoying		
2022	Olovli yurak		
2023–2024	Uxlamaysizmi		
2024	Oʻzimizda		

=== Music videos ===
Year	Title	Artist	Role
2022	Yolgʻonchim	Ulugbek Raxmatullayev	Actor
2022	Yomgʻir	Yorqinxoʻja Umarov	Actor
2022	Lalixon	Nilufar Usmonova	Actor
2022	Bahor kelguncha	Yahyobek Moʻmonov	Actor
2023	Цветы	Yorqinxoʻja Umarov	Actor
2023	Oyning oʻn beshi qorongʻu	Botir Qodirov	Actor
2023	Zuhroginam	Dadaxon Obidov	Actor
2023	Zolim	Munisa Rizayeva	Actor
2023	Kerakmas	Via Marokand	Actor
2023	Yetmasmidi	Jaloliddin Ahmadaliyev	Actor
2023	Yoʻq-Yoʻq	Botir Qodirov	Actor
2024	Koʻrmasam boʻlmaydi	Qilichbek Madaliyev	Actor
2024	Yovuz	Gulasal	Actor
2024	Dugonagdan asra meni	Imron	Actor

== Awards and recognitions ==
- Young actress of 2017.
- 2018 My5 TV Best Female Actress
- The best actress of 2019 at the MTV awards ceremony.
- And in 2023, I became the owner of the "Culture and Art Sacrifice" badge.
- In 2024 she received the "Builder of the Future" medal.

Year	Prize	Category	Movie	Result
2019	Etirof	La mejor actriz	Herencia	
2019	My5	La mejor actriz	Herencia	Won
2023	Oltin humo	La mejor actriz	Vieja niña	
2023	Toji Somon	La mejor actriz	Vieja niña	Won
2023	IV Xalqaro “Lendok”	La mejor actriz	Vieja niña	Won
2023	Buyuk ipak yoʻli Toshkent	La mejor actriz	Vieja niña	
