= Caos (Titãs song) =

Single by Titãs

from the album Olho Furta-Cor
- Language: Portuguese
- English title: Chaos
- Released: 14 July 2022
- Recorded: 2022
- Studio: Midas Studios
- Genre: Rock
- Length: 3:14
- Label: Midas Music
- Songwriters: Rita Lee, Roberto de Carvalho, Beto Lee
- Producers: Sérgio Fouad, Rick Bonadio

Titãs singles chronology
"Pra Dizer Adeus" (2020)	"Caos" (2022)	"Papai e Mamãe" (2023)

Music video
- "Caos" on YouTube

"Caos" ("chaos" in Portuguese) is a song and single by Brazilian rock band Titãs, released on 14 July 2022 via Midas Music and produced by Sérgio Fouad and Rick Bonadio, taken from the trio's seventeenth studio album Olho Furta-Cor.

The song was composed by Rita Lee, Roberto de Carvalho and their son Beto Lee, who's a session guitarist for the group. The track ended up being the last ever written by Rita Lee, who would later die in May 2023.

== Lyrics ==
The chorus incorporates the anarchist slogan "hay gobierno soy contra" ([if] there's government, I'm against (it)) which, according to vocalist Sérgio Britto, is directed to "the ones who are in power", while also serving as "a warning to society as a whole to keep ever vigilant in regards with those who are in power". Producer Rick Bonadio stated that it manifests the message "that I myself would like to deliver to Brazil in this political moment: it's chaos!".

Britto said the track alludes to the moment lived by Brazil under Bolsonaro, but in a humorous way, which was typical of Rita Lee.

== Video ==
The single received a video directed by Otávio Juliano, who had already worked with the band in other occasions. The effort is mostly black & white, with colors used occasionally to highlight members, and includes distorted images on the background.

== Reception ==
=== Critical reception ===
On Fórum magazine, Julinho Bittencourt criticized the lyrics, labeling the mentioned "chaos" as something "make believe, ludic". He accused the band of throwing everything "in the same bag in the old, worn and alienated idea that 'all politicians are the same'" and saw many platitudes on the lyrics. He concluded by saying that "demanding political stances from artists is messed up. However, criticizing them when they're extemporaneous and detached from the political time in which they are released is more than necessary."

In his website Farofafá, Pedro Alexandre Sanchez saw a "common graveyard of lavajatism 'against all of this that's there'" on the chorus, which according to him would "sound passable in countless other historical Brazilian moments, but in this dark 2022 it's worth tapping into the worn idea that omission before fascism is not omission, it's adhesion and complicity, if not bovine approval." He also accused members of, on the verse "Sou hippie das antigas / do velho e bom paz e amor" ("I'm an oldschool hippie / of the good old peace & love"), ignoring "blatantly that the anti-politics and anti-system speech, which once belonged to the hippies, is currently kidnapped in Brazil by a (ex-)military called Jair Bolsonaro".

In his blog on G1, Mauro Ferreira saw "Caos" as something that promotes "the connection of the first lady of Brazilian rock [Rita Lee] and Roberto de Carvalho [...] with an emblematic band of the pop generation revealed and projected throughout the 1980s". He compared the lyrical themes with the output of albums Cabeça Dinossauro and Jesus Não Tem Dentes no País dos Banguelas, although he doesn't see it with "the virulence of that time". He concluded his analysis claiming that "it would be cruel to demand from the 2022 trio the relevance and the heaviness of the 1980s band. However, Titãs honor their rocker past in the recording [...]. Caos is rock without a real originality touch, but neither is it the plastic pop frequently created by bands conducted under Bonadio's market-oriented baton.

== Track listing ==
"Caos" tracks
No.	Title	Music	Length
1.	"Caos"	Rita Lee, Roberto de Carvalho, Beto Lee	3:14

== Personnel ==
Titãs

- Titãs - arrangements
- Sérgio Britto - lead vocals
- Tony Bellotto - guitar
- Branco Mello - bass

Supporting members

- Beto Lee - guitar
- Mario Fabre - drums

Technical personnel

- Rick Bonadio - production, recording and mixing engineering, mastering, general and artistic direction
- Sérgio Fouad - production, recording and mixing engineering
- Junior Lanne and Ozeias Matos - additional recording engineering
- César Botinha - editing and guitar tech
- Matheus Peixoto - digital distribution
- Gabriela Bonadio - marketing and product
- Léo Mergulhão - product manager

Technical personnel (video)

- Otávio Juliano - direction and conception
- Luciana Ferraz - direction and montage
- Interface Filmes - production
- Diego Garc - photography direction
- Fabio Braga - camera assistang
- Los Angeles Filmes - finalization
- Anna Rita Trunkl - make up
- Edilson "Tio Edi" - electric
