= Olho Furta-Cor =

Studio album by Titãs
- Released: 2 September 2022
- Recorded: May–June 2022
- Studio: Midas
- Genre: Rock
- Length: 49:38
- Languages: Portuguese, Spanish
- Label: Midas Music
- Producers: Rick Bonadio, Sérgio Fouad

Titãs chronology
Titãs Trio Acústico (2020)	Olho Furta-Cor (2022)	Microfonado (2024)

Singles from Olho Furta-Cor
- 1. "Caos" Released: 14 July 2022; 2. "Papai e Mamãe" Released: 19 May 2023; 3. "São Paulo 1" Released: 25 April 2025

Olho Furta-Cor ("Iridescent Eye") is the seventeenth studio album by Brazilian rock band Titãs, released on 2 September 2022 via Midas Music. The album was recorded in 2022 at Estúdios Midas, produced by Rick Bonadio and Sergio Fouad, and is a celebration of the group's 40th anniversary.

It was nominated for the 2023 Latin Grammy for Best Portuguese Language Rock or Alternative Album, but lost it to Jardineiros, by Planet Hemp.

== Background and promotion ==
Before Olho Furta-Cor, the last studio album with original materia released by the band had been the rock opera Doze Flores Amarelas, which was supported with a limited tour due to the high costs of bringing the project onto the stage.

On 29 May 2018, the band announced that vocalist/bassist Branco Mello would take a short leave to treat a tumor in his larynx. Once he resumed activities, the band entered the studio to record Titãs Trio Acústico, which was released in three parts and contained re-recordings of old songs and was followed by an unplugged tour throughout Brazil in 2019–2022.

On 12 November 2021, the band announces that Mello will take another leave to treat the relapse tumor. This time, the pause was longer and Mello only returned 7 months later. Under medical advice, he only sang "Cabeça Dinossauro" during the shows due to the disease severely affecting his voice.

=== Recording and release ===
The album was prepared in meetings at Mello's house and also isolatedly by each member in their houses until they had a demo. Following this, they went to the studio to finish it. As the health safety measures against the COVID-19 pandemic were lifted and the group resumed its acoustic tour, some new songs were included in the setlists. All songs were composed in 2021.

Mello's vocal parts were included based on demos that he recorded before facing the health issues that compromised his voice.

Olho Furta-Cor was released on 2 September 2022, with a launch show held on 10 of the same month at Tokio Marine Hall in São Paulo. The album press release was written by journalist Pedro Bial, who claimed "Titãs have always been the chroniclers of their time, with more fury than consolation. Maybe fury as the only possible consolation".

On 25 April 2025, they released a video for the single "São Paulo 1", generated with artificial intelligence by director Arnaldo Belotto based on inspirations suggested by Mello, such as the film M, by Fritz Lang.

== Concept ==
When asked about the concept behind the album, vocalist/keyboardist Sérgio Britto said that "in this 'Iridescent Eye' it's like we had a multicolor look, that is, this color that contains every color, as if we were looking with a diverse look into Brazil and the world. We comment several facts that have been going on lately, such as this isolation in the pandemic, the difficult political moment, the polarization in Brazil and the world… I believe all these topics are present in the album and some other lighter ones, too". He also says that "although the country is living with threats against democracy, there's a scent of renovation in the air, with a search for new political paths. The "iridescent eye" would manifest something that's simultaneously colorless and with all colors.

Guitarist Tony Bellotto says the album brings doses of optimism, even with lyrics covering dense and negative topics. "We closely followed the process of re-democratization of Brazil in a very visceral manner. In our childhood and teenage years, we lived under a military dictatorship. Britto himself lived for years out of Brazil in exile with his father. So, it's terrifying to see that, after all that, a far-right government rose to power with so much popular support. But the album is like an iridescent eye. We're shocked, but also hopeful."

The title of the album is taken off a verse of the song "São Paulo 3", composed by Britto with words from a poem by Haroldo de Campos which was introduced to the group by theater director Felipe Hirsch. From the same text came the lyrics of another song - "São Paulo 1", which closes the album. According to Britto, the songs express different aspects of the city: "the more oneiric, almost lisérgico side" ("São Paulo 3") and "the more brute, angry side” ("São Paulo 1"). Originally, "São Paulo" was supposed to be one single track, but the band ended up splitting it and in this process, part 2 was lost.

Besides the band's 40th anniversary, the year of the album release also marks two other anniversaries of events that somehow influenced it: 200 years of the independence of Brazil and 100 years of the São Paulo Modern Art Week.

== Song information ==
The opening track, "Apocalipse Só", was written by Britto and Bellotto and speaks about the dforestation of the Amazon Rainforest. It includes a Xingu chant and a children's choir from Anelo Institute, from Campinas; the chant was included following a deal with Funai for the responsible tribe to be financially compensated; their performance alludes to the devastation of the Amazon and an apocalyptic atmosphere. The children, on the other hand, were recruited to convey a sense of hope and renovation, in opposition to the bitter and apocalyptic mood of the lyrics. The band had already collaborated with the choir on a remixed version of "Epitáfio" by Alok.

The single "Caos", released on 14 July 2022, was written as a gift by Rita Lee and Roberto de Carvalho (plus their son and supporting member Beto Lee). Commenting about it, Britto said it references the moment lived by Brazil under Bolsonaro, but in a humorous way, which was typical of Rita Lee. The track ended up being the last written by Lee, who would die in May 2023.

"Como é Bom Ser Simples" (written by Mello, his son Bento and Hugo Possolo) speaks about "detachment" and "attempts to unlink from all these threats, from these disorders which surround us, from the political instability, from the pandemic while being zen, without refraining from touching spicy subjects". "Raul" is a tribute to Raul Seixas and alludes to the relationship between the baião of Luiz Gonzaga and the rock by Elvis Presley which the singer established in an interview with Pedro Bial, as well as the one between the "Old Man River" with the "Velho Chico". The lyrics further establish parallels between Andy Warhol and Mestre Vitalino; Jackson do Pandeiro and Chuck Berry; Bob Dylan and Patativa do Assaré; Bill Haley and Zé do Fole; Johnny Cash and Catulo da Paixão Cearense; and Mark Twain and Ariano Suassuna.

"Há de Ser Assim" is a song that "begs for empathy" and "Papai e Mamãe", written by Britto, was inspired by the consequences of social distancing in teenagers - such as Britto's daughter herself. Initially, the lyrics were from the perspective of a father inviting his daughter to come out and see the world, but he felt this wouldn't relate to teenagers going through this, so he inverted it and had the it follow an isolated person beginning an introspective process. The song was released as a single with a video animated in a half-manga, half-Brazilian art style. It was written and directed by Nico Matteis.

"Por Galettas" has Spanish lyrics and was written by Britto about accusations of sexual abuse by peace-keeping UN forces in Haiti, a topic which came to his attention in an article by El País.

Other topics include polarization ("Um Mundo") and love between two men ("Preciso Falar")

== Track listing ==
Olho Furta-cor tracks
No.	Title	Writer(s)	Lead vocals	Length
1.	"Apocalipse Só" (Apocalypse Alone)	Sérgio Britto, Tony Bellotto	Bellotto and Instituto Anelo children choir	3:32
2.	"Caos" (Chaos)	Rita Lee, Beto Lee, Roberto de Carvalho	Britto	3:14
3.	"São Paulo 3"	Britto, Haroldo de Campos	Britto	2:57
4.	"Como é Bom Ser Simples" (It's So Good to Be Simple)	Branco Mello, Hugo Possolo, Bento Mello	Branco Mello	2:57
5.	"Raul"	Britto	Britto	2:47
6.	"Um Mundo" (A World)	Britto, Bellotto	Bellotto	2:44
7.	"Há de Ser Assim" (Has to Be This Way)	Britto	Britto	3:07
8.	"Papai e Mamãe" (Daddy and Mommy)	Britto	Britto	3:15
9.	"Eu Sou o Mal" (I'm the Evil)	Bellotto	Bellotto	2:20
10.	"Por Galletas" (For Biscuits)	Britto	Britto	2:46
11.	"O Melhor Amigo do Cão" (A Dog's Best Friend)	Mello, Bellotto	Mello	2:29
12.	"Preciso Falar" (I Need to Speak)	Bellotto	Bellotto	2:10
13.	"Miss Brasil 200 Anos" (Miss Brazil 200 Years)	Mário Fabre	Britto, Fabre	2:19
14.	"São Paulo 1"	Britto, Haroldo de Campos	Britto	3:16

== Personnel ==
=== Titãs ===
- Branco Mello - lead vocals on track 4, co-lead vocals on track 11, bass.
- Sérgio Britto - lead vocals on tracks 2, 5, 7, 8, 10 and 14, co-lead vocals on tracks 11 and 13, backing vocals, keyboards, piano on tracks 6, 7 and 11, acoustic guitar on tracks 8 and 10.
- Tony Bellotto - lead vocals on tracks 1, 6, 9 and 12, electric guitar on all tracks except 3, 6, 8, and 12, slide guitar on tracks 3,10 and 12, acoustic guitar on tracks 6, 8, 10, 11 and 12.

=== Session musicians ===
- Beto Lee - electric guitar on all tracks except 8, 10 and 11.
- Mario Fabre - co-lead vocals on track 13, drums on all tracks.

=== Guest appearances ===
- Instituto Anelo's children choir - choir on track 1.
