= CAOS =

CAOS, Caos or alternatively styled forms of the word may refer to:

== Abbreviations ==
- Calgary Animated Objects Society, a non-profit charitable arts organization
- CAOs, former abbreviation for Contemporary Art Organisations of Australia, of which ACE Open is a member
- CAOS Linux, a former RPM-based Linux distribution
- Chilling Adventures of Sabrina (TV series), an American supernatural TV series on Netflix
- Computer-Assisted Organic Synthesis software
- Computer-assisted orthopedic surgery

== People ==
- Gary Caos, Italian DJ and producer
- Silvia Caos (1933–2006), Cuban-born Mexican actress

== Music ==
- "Caos" (Fabri Fibra song), 2022
- "Caos" (Titãs song), 2022
- Caos (Miguel album), 2025

== See also ==
- Chaos (disambiguation)
