= List of films shot in Riverside, California =

The following is a list of films shot, at least in part, in Riverside, California.

The films shot at the Riverside International Raceway and at March Air Force Base are outside the Riverside city limits, but they have been included because both locations are closely associated with the city of Riverside. The Riverside International Raceway no longer exists, and March Air Force Base has been renamed the March Joint Air Reserve Base, now more closely associated with Moreno Valley, California.

Released	Title	Stars	Location	Notes
1915	The Vampire	Olga Petrova; Vernon Steele	Mission Inn	
1919	Boots	Dorothy Gish	Mission Inn	
1929	Redskin	Richard Dix; Julie Carter	Sherman Indian Institute	
1933	State Fair	Janet Gaynor; Will Rogers	Southern California Fair Grounds	The Fair Grounds, north of Fairmount Park, no longer exist.
1933	Today We Live	Joan Crawford; Gary Cooper; Robert Young	March Field	The base was closed by General Douglas MacArthur to allow MGM crews to film there.
1938	Test Pilot	Clark Gable; Myrna Loy; Spencer Tracy; Lionel Barrymore	March Field	
1939	Dark Victory	Bette Davis; Humphrey Bogart; George Brent; Ronald Reagan	Southern California Fair Grounds	The Fair Grounds, north of Fairmount Park, no longer exist.
1939	Idiot's Delight	Norma Shearer; Clark Gable; Edward Arnold; Charles Coburn; Burgess Meredith	Mission Inn	
1943	My Favorite Blonde	Bob Hope	March Field	
1951	The First Legion	Charles Boyer	Mission Inn	Used as a monastery.
1957	Jet Pilot	John Wayne; Janet Leigh	March Air Force Base	Shot in 1949–50, but released later.
1959	On the Beach	Gregory Peck; Ava Gardner; Fred Astaire; Anthony Perkins	Riverside International Raceway	Car race scene.
1964	Strait-Jacket	Joan Crawford; Diane Baker; Leif Erickson; Howard St. John		One week shot on location in Riverside during July–August 1963.
1964	The Killers	Lee Marvin; Angie Dickinson; John Cassavetes; Ronald Reagan	Riverside International Raceway	Scheduled as first shoot on November 21, 1963, but delayed due to rain. The crew later returned for two days of filming in November–December 1963.
1965	Two on a Guillotine	Connie Stevens; Dean Jones; Cesar Romero	Benedict Castle	
1965	Red Line 7000	James Caan; Laura Devon	Riverside International Raceway	
1966	Grand Prix	James Garner; Eva Marie Saint	Riverside International Raceway	
1968	The Love Bug	Dean Jones; Michele Lee; Buddy Hackett	Riverside International Raceway	
1969	Tell Them Willie Boy Is Here	Robert Redford; Katharine Ross; Robert Blake	Mission Inn	
1969	Winning	Paul Newman; Joanne Woodward; Robert Wagner; Richard Thomas	Riverside International Raceway	
1973	Genesis II	Alex Cord; Mariette Hartley	U.C. Riverside	In this TV movie, a pilot for a television show by Star Trek creator Gene Roddenberry, UCR provided the location for the futuristic city of Tyrania.
1975	Bug	Bradford Dillman; Joanna Miles	U.C. Riverside	
1975	The Wild Party	James Coco; Raquel Welch	Mission Inn	
1977	Black Samurai	Jim Kelly	Mission Inn	
1981	Buddy Buddy	Jack Lemmon; Walter Matthau	Mission Inn	
1982	The Sword and the Sorcerer	Lee Horsley	Mission Inn	
1985	Real Genius	Val Kilmer; Michelle Meyrink	Mission Inn; March Air Force Base; Moreno Valley	
1986	Body Slam	Dirk Benedict; Rowdy Roddy Piper; Billy Barty; Captain Lou Albano; Ric Flair; Tanya Roberts; Sam Fatu	Mission Inn; Raincross Square; Riverside Historic Courthouse; Riverside City Hall	
1988	Vibes	Jeff Goldblum; Cyndi Lauper	Mission Inn	
1989	Cannibal Women in the Avocado Jungle of Death	Shannon Tweed; Bill Maher; Adrienne Barbeau	U.C. Riverside; UCR Botanic Gardens	UCR is the location of the fictional Spritzer College, and several of the jungle scenes were filmed in the UCR Botanic Gardens. Other jungle scenes were shot nearby, including behind the Bannockburn student apartments.
1995	Nixon	Anthony Hopkins; Joan Allen	Mission Inn	
1998	The Man in the Iron Mask (a.k.a. The Face of Alexandre Dumas: The Man in the Iron Mask)	Edward Albert; Dana Barron; Timothy Bottoms	Mission Inn	
1999	Blink 182: The Urethra Chronicles	Mark Hoppus; Thomas DeLonge; Travis Barker	Galleria at Tyler	
2000	Boys and Girls	Freddie Prinze, Jr. Claire Forlani; Jason Biggs; Amanda Detmer	U.C. Riverside	Set at University of California, Berkeley, but some scenes were filmed at UCR.
2001	Cafe Tango	Gloria Otero; Claudio Otero; Rebecca De Roche	Sevilla Restaurant & Tapas Bar	
2001	What's the Worst That Could Happen?	Martin Lawrence; Danny DeVito; John Leguizamo	Riverside County Historic Courthouse, Mission Inn	
2002	Slackers	Jason Schwartzman; Devon Sawa; Jason Segel; Michael Maronna; Jaime King; Laura Prepon	U.C. Riverside	The fictional Holden University utilizes both the UCR campus and the nearby University of Redlands.
2003	Neverland	Deborah Quayle; Wil Wheaton	Castle Park	
2008	Eagle Eye	Shia LaBeouf; Michelle Monaghan; Rosario Dawson	March Air Force Base	
2009	Perfect Mismatch	Nandana Sen; Anupam Kher; Boman Irani	Fairmount Park	

== See also ==
- List of films and TV series set in Palm Springs, California
- List of films shot in Palm Springs, California
