= Oʻzbek qizi =

- Directed by: Akbar Bekturdiyev
- Written by: Akbar Bekturdiyev
- Produced by: Firdavs Abdukhalikov; Akbar Bekturdiyev
- Starring: Aysanem Yusupova; Feruza Saidova; Oleg Taktarov; Sergey Lapanitsin; Milana Ivanova; Yigitali Mamajonov
- Cinematography: Husan Alijonov; Maksim Kurovskiy
- Music by: Donyor Agzamov
- Production companies: Uzbekistan Cinematography Agency; Sinema of Sentral Asia; Parason Prodakshn
- Release date: May 9, 2023
- Running time: 136 min. / 2ch. 16 min.
- Countries: Uzbekistan; Belarus
- Languages: Uzbek; Russian

Oʻzbek qizi is a 2023 Uzbek military drama film directed and written by Akbar Bekturdiyev. The Film Agency of Uzbekistan acted as the general producer of the film. The film is the first joint project with the "Belarusfilm" studio.

== Plot ==
Jamila (Aysenem Yusupova), an 18-year-old sniper and a graduate of a military weapons school, volunteers on the Kalinin Front in Belarus, as her lover is fighting on one of the war fronts. Jamila undergoes combat training and becomes fully trained in the process. She endures all hardships and struggles and fights valiantly, but is wounded and captured by the Germans. As events unfold, Jamila finds her lover, who turns out to be a triple agent working undercover for the Nazis. He rescues Jamila and sneaks her through the forest, where they are stopped by Belarusian partisans.

== Cast ==
- Aysanem Yusupova — Jamila
- Zulxumor Moʻminova
- Muhammadiso Abdulxairov
- Feruza Saidova
- Oleg Taktarov
- Sergey Lapanitsin
- Milana Ivanova
- Yigitali Mamajonov

== Creation ==
Filming is being carried out with the help of the Cinema of Central Asia studio and the Parason Production studio of the Republic of Belarus, on behalf of the Cinematography Agency of Uzbekistan. The main character, Jamila, was based on the Soviet sniper Zebo Ganiyeva. Zebo Ganiyeva was born in 1923 in Shamakha, Azerbaijan. Her father was Uzbek by nationality, and her mother was also Uzbek. Speaking about the prototype of the main character, the film's second director, Bakhriddin Ainazarov, says that the sniper Jamila is a composite image of hundreds of women who took part in the Great Patriotic War. Before filming began, the lead actress, Aysenem Yusupova, had to master hand-to-hand combat techniques and the handling of cold weapons and a sniper rifle. Most of the filming took place in Belarus: in the museum street of Zabroddie and in the forests of Belarus. Filming was announced in early January 2023.

== Awards and nominations ==
Winner of the 2023 Golden Humo Award in the "Best Film" category.

== Sound post-production ==
Sound director Anvar Fayzullayev. Sound design Donyor Agzamov. CineLab sound post-production complex. Dolby Digital 5.1

=== Music ===
The music for the film "Oʻzbek qizi" was written Donyor Agzamov.
