= Beverly Johnson =

American model, actress (born 1952)

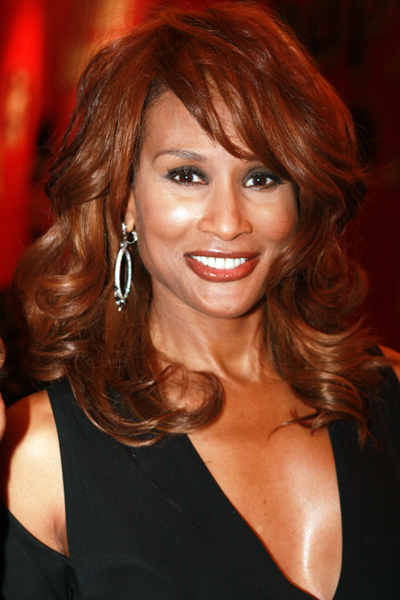
- Johnson in 2007
- Born: Beverly Ann Johnson; October 13, 1952 (age 73); Buffalo, New York, U.S.
- Education: Northeastern University
- Occupations: Model; actress; singer; businesswoman
- Years active: 1970–present
- Known for: First African-American model on Vogue cover, August 1974
- Spouse(s): Billy Potter (m. 1971; div. 1974) Danny Sims (m. 1977; div. 1979) Brian Maillian (m. 2023)
- Partner: Chris Noth (1990–1995)
- Children: 1
- Modeling information
- Height: 5 ft 8 in (1.73 m)
- Hair color: Dark brown
- Eye color: Brown

Beverly Ann Johnson (born October 13, 1952) is an American model, actress, singer, and businesswoman. Johnson rose to fame when she became the first Black model to appear on the cover of American Vogue in August 1974, after Donyale Luna was the first Black model to appear on the cover of British Vogue in 1966. In 2012, Johnson was the star of the reality series Beverly's Full House that aired on the Oprah Winfrey Network (OWN). In 2008, The New York Times named Johnson one of the 20th century's most influential people in fashion.

== Early life, family and education ==
Born the first of two children to Gloria Johnson, a surgical technician, Johnson was raised in a middle-class family in Buffalo, New York. During her youth, Johnson was a champion swimmer and aspired to be a lawyer. She was close to qualifying for the 1968 Olympics in the 100-yard freestyle event.

Johnson attended Bennett High School, graduating in 1969. After high school, Johnson studied criminal justice at Northeastern University on a full academic scholarship.

== Career ==
While in college, Johnson tried modeling while on summer break in 1971. She quickly landed an assignment with Glamour and began working steadily. She went on to appear on more than 500 magazine covers, including the August 1974 issue of Vogue, becoming the magazine's first African-American cover model for the US edition, after Donyale Luna's 1966 British Vogue cover. Her appearance on the cover changed the beauty ideal in US fashion, and by 1975, every major American fashion designer had begun using African-American models.

Johnson appeared on the cover of Vogue again in June 1975 for their "American Woman" issue, and by then had also become a runway model for the designer Halston. By 1977, she had appeared on the covers of about 25 magazines, including 14 for Glamour, and was the first Black woman to appear solo on the cover of Elle. (Note: Donyale Luna, was the first black model to be featured on the cover of Elle. Appearing on the cover of the 7 July 1966 issue alongside Jill Kennington.)

In addition to modeling, Johnson has also written the books Beverly Johnson's Guide to a Life of Health and Beauty and True Beauty: Secrets of Radiant Beauty for Women of Every Age and Color. Johnson's acting career consists of roles in the films Ashanti (1979), The Meteor Man (1993), Def Jam's How to Be a Player (1997), and Crossroads (2002). She has appeared in guest spots on 7 television series, including Martin (TV series), Law & Order, Lois & Clark: The New Adventures of Superman, The Parent 'Hood and the Super Bowl episode of 3rd Rock from the Sun (1998). She served for two seasons as a celebrity judge on the TV Land series She's Got the Look, a reality series, where women aged over 35 compete for a modeling contract and magazine spread. At the start of the series in 2008, Johnson shared that she and other models had suffered from anorexia and bulimia during her career. She had a brief singing career, releasing one album in 1979 on Buddah Records. Johnson has been a longtime hair and beauty influencer.

In 1987 Johnson and her daughter participated in AIDS Awareness Campaign advertisements.

In 2024, Johnson embarked on a one-woman off-Broadway show, Beverly Johnson: In Vogue. It was characterized as an "intimate, live biography with Johnson taking the stage to share her personal dispatches in the ever-shifting, but never dull, fashion and entertainment industries."

== Memoir and accusation against Bill Cosby ==
In late 2014, she wrote an article for Vanity Fair in which she accused Bill Cosby of drugging her in a meeting at his Manhattan residence in the 1980s, although the incident did not result in a sexual assault. Johnson said that Cosby spiked a cup of cappuccino with an unknown drug. As she felt her "body go completely limp," she realized what was happening. Johnson said she then screamed and cursed at him several times before Cosby got angry and dragged her outside and hailed a cab for her. Johnson decided to tell her story in hopes that "by going public" she would "encourage anyone [who] has been sexually victimized to speak out." Her memoir, The Face That Changed It All, which discusses the Cosby incident, was released on August 25, 2015.

Subsequently, Cosby started a defamation lawsuit against Johnson, stating that she was lying about the drugging incident and contending that Johnson's story, first told in the Vanity Fair article, had been repeated in numerous interviews. The lawsuit sought unspecified damages and an injunction to prevent Johnson from repeating her claims and to require her to remove them from her memoir. Cosby dropped the lawsuit on February 19, 2016, allegedly to devote more time to his criminal case.

== Personal life ==
Johnson has been married thrice. Her first marriage was to real estate agent Billy Potter in 1971, later divorcing in 1974. On May 8, 1977, Johnson, then aged 25, married 40-year-old businessman and music producer Danny Sims. She gave birth to their daughter, Anansa Sims on December 27, 1978, in New York City. Johnson and Sims divorced in 1979.

Johnson and actor Chris Noth were in a five-year relationship until 1995. She filed a restraining order against Noth, accusing him of physical, verbal and racial abuse.

On January 13, 2023, Johnson married her longtime partner, Brian Maillian, a successful financier, Chairman and CEO of Whitestone Global Partners LLC. She was inducted as an honorary member of Alpha Kappa Alpha sorority on July 13, 2025.

== Filmography ==
=== Film ===
Year	Title	Role	Notes
1975	Deadly Hero	-	
1977	The Baron	Receptionist	
1978	Crisis in Sun Valley	Beverly	TV movie
1979	Ashanti	Dr. Anansa Linderby	
1980	The Sky Is Gray	John Lee's Mother	TV movie
1993	Loaded Weapon 1	Doris Luger	
1993	The Meteor Man	Woman Doctor	
1993	The Cover Girl Murders	Michaela	TV movie
1993	A Perry Mason Mystery: The Case of the Wicked Wives	Jane Marlowe Morrison	TV movie
1994	A Brilliant Disguise	Barbara	
1995	Ray Alexander: A Menu for Murder	Alana Durand	TV movie
1996	Crossworlds	The Queen	
1997	Def Jam's How to Be a Player	Robin	
1997	True Vengeance	Lt. Kada Wilson	Video
1998	54	Elaine's Patron	
2000	Down 'n Dirty	Sandra Collins	
2002	Crossroads	Kit's Mother	
2012	Good Deeds	Brenda	

=== Television ===
Year	Title	Role	Notes
1979	The American Sportsman	Herself	Episode: "Paul Newman Auto Racing, Bert Jones Geese Hunting"
1989	Saturday Night Live	Herself	Episode: "Leslie Nielsen/Cowboy Junkies"
1990	Hunter	Allistar Lang	Episode: "This Is My Gun"
1992	It's Showtime at the Apollo	Herself/Guest Host	Episode: "Episode #5.17"
1992	Law & Order	Salamotu	Episode: "Consultation"
1993	Martin	Ms. Trinidad	Episode: "Blackboard Jungle Fever"
1993	Out All Night	Lorraine	Episode: "The Way We Were"
1993	Law & Order	Marcela Di Portago	Episode: "Black Tie"
1994	An Evening at the Improv	Herself/Host	Episode: "Episode #14.10"
1994	The Mommies	Herself	Episode: "The Exercist"
1994	Lois & Clark: The New Adventures of Superman	Mrs. Cox	Recurring Cast: Season 1
1995	Mad TV	Herself	Episode: "Episode #1.2"
1995	The Wayans Bros.	Miss Kita	Episode: "I'm Too Sexy for My Brother"
1996	The Parent 'Hood	Mrs. Jordan	Episode: "I'm O'Tay, You're O-Tay"
1996	Arli$$	Herself	Episode: "The Client's Best Interest"
1996	Red Shoe Diaries	Lorri	Episode: "The Forbidden Zone"
1997	E! True Hollywood Story	Herself	Episode: "Margaux Hemingway"
1997	Sabrina, the Teenage Witch	Fashion Director	Episode: "As Westbridge Turns"
1998	3rd Rock from the Sun	Prell	Episode: "36! 24! 36! Dick!: Part 1 & 2"
2004	Girlfriends	Herself	Episode: "Leggo My Ego"
2005	E! True Hollywood Story	Herself	Episode: "Janice Dickinson"
2005–12	America's Next Top Model	Herself	Recurring Guest
2008–10	She's Got the Look	Herself/Judge	Main Judge
2010	Tyler Perry's Meet The Browns	Kate	Episode: "Meet the Other Man" & "Meet the Old Fling"
2011	RuPaul's Drag U	Herself/Judge	Episode: "Bringing Sexy Back"
2012	Beverly's Full House	Herself	Main Cast
2013	Celebrity Ghost Stories	Herself	Episode: "Beverly Johnson/Charlene Tilton/Jimmy Wayne"
2019	American Style	Herself	Episode: "Born to Be Wild" & "Material World"

== Discography ==
=== Albums ===
- Don't Lose The Feeling (1979)

=== Singles ===
- "Don't Lose The Feeling" (1979)
- "Don't Run for a Cover" (1979)

== See also ==
- Amekor
- Liberian Girl
