= Amekor =

American manufacturer

Amekor Industries
- Industry: manufacturing
- Founded: 1979; 47 years ago
- Headquarters: Conshohocken, Montgomery County, Pennsylvania
- Products: wigs extensions hairpieces

Amekor Industries is a manufacturer and distributor of wigs, extensions and hairpieces. Based in Conshohocken, Montgomery County, Pennsylvania, Amekor Industries was founded in 1979. The name Amekor is a portmanteau of American and Korean, signifying the partnership between the company founders.

In 1996, the company partnered with Beverly Johnson, the first African American model on the covers of Vogue and Glamour, and her team of stylists to create a new line of hair products specifically for African-American women.

In 2010, Amekor began a new venture when it teamed up with Vivica A. Fox to help her with the Vivica A. Fox Hair Collection.
