= Meros (film) =

- Directed by: Xilol Nasimov
- Written by: Xilol Nasimov
- Starring: Rustam Karimov; Aysanem Yusupova; Munavvara Abdullayeva; Gʻayrat Xusainov; Bobur Aytbagambetov; Fotih Nasimov
- Cinematography: Husan Alijonov
- Production company: Oʻzbekiston Kinematografiya agentligi
- Release date: May 9, 2021
- Running time: 88 min
- Country: Uzbekistan
- Language: Uzbek

Meros Filmed in 2021, the film is about the unity of faith, traditions and centuries-old friendship of the Uzbek and Kazakh peoples. The prestigious international Golden Fox Award was held in Australia. The film won the "Best Dramatic Film" award at the Muslim Film Festival international film festival. The film was shot on the order of the Cinematography Agency of Uzbekistan.

== Plot ==
The film "Heritage" tells about the unity of faith, traditions and centuries-old friendship of the Uzbek and Kazakh peoples. It shows the greatness of the Uzbek nation, the life of the Uzbeks, who showed the concepts of friendship, kindness and tolerance among peoples, who were not indifferent to the fate of the neighboring nations. Uzbek boy Bakhshillo sympathizes with Kazakh girl Aigul. Nurlan, a Kazakh from another village, also fell in love with her. These two young people, who do not know each other, fight together during the Great Patriotic War and save each other from death. Also, the film tells about how Tariqat Yassavi, founded by Ahmed Yassavi, calls all Muslims to faith and a deep understanding of humanity as a spiritual heritage.

== Cast ==
- Fotih Nasimov
- Aysanem Yusupova
- Rustam Karimov
- Munavvara Abdullayeva
- Gʻayrat Xusainov
- Bobur Aytbagambetov

== Reception ==
Turkish filmmakers specially recognized that the film is a valuable work of art and has a deep place in their hearts.

== Production ==
Filming of "Heritage" started in 2020. Filming took place in Uzbekistan, Kazakhstan and Belarus.

== Awards and nominations ==
The film received a special diploma at the Zolotoy Vityaz film forum held in Russia in May 2022 "for revealing the theme of the commonality of traditions and relations between the Kazakh and Uzbek peoples." It was awarded "Best Foreign Film" and "Best Foreign Film" at the Golden Horse Film Festival held in India in July 2022 and "Best Foreign Film" at the Gandhra Independent Film Festival (GIFF) held in Pakistan. Was also awarded in the nominations "good directorial work". To date, Meros has won the nominations "Best Film of the Year" at more than ten international festivals and "Best Director's work" at four more festivals. The film was entered in the INCA IMPERIAL INTERNATIONAL FILM FESTIVAL in Lima on May 12–15, 2022.
