= Doze Flores Amarelas =

Studio album by Titãs
- Released: April 27, 2018 (Act I); May 4, 2018 (Act II); May 11, 2018 (Act III)
- Recorded: 2017–2018
- Genre: Rock
- Length: 71:40
- Label: Universal Music
- Producer: Rafael Ramos

Titãs chronology
Nheengatu ao Vivo (2015)	Doze Flores Amarelas (2018)	Titãs Trio Acústico (2020)

Doze Flores Amarelas (Twelve Yellow Flowers) is the fifteenth studio album by Brazilian rock band Titãs, released in parts from 27 April to 11 May 2018. It is the band's first album via Universal Music, the first without vocalist, guitarist and founding member Paulo Miklos (who quit the group in 2016) and the first with his session replacement Beto Lee, son of Brazilian rock singer Rita Lee, who guest performs on the album with narrations.

The album is a rock opera with a story written by the band and co-written by Hugo Possolo and Marcelo Rubens Paiva. The plot follows three undergraduate female students raped by five colleagues and the consequences brought upon all of them by the crime. The album release was preceded by an homonymous theater, cinema and music spectacle that was later recorded and released in DVD. A tour is expected to promote the album all around Brazil in 2019.

== Background ==
On July 11, 2016, vocalist, guitarist and founding member Paulo Miklos announced he would leave the band to focus on his personal projects. He was then replaced by session member Beto Lee, son of notorious Brazilian rock singer Rita Lee.

With Lee's inclusion, the band recovered some old songs for its live setlists, including Titanomaquia's "Será Que É Disso Que Eu Necessito?" and "Nem Sempre se Pode Ser Deus". They also started to have guitarist Tony Bellotto sing in some songs.

Also in 2016, the band announced a new album for a possible 2017 release. According to Bellotto, it would be a rock opera, and the band intended to enter the studio until mid-2017 so the album could be released in the year's second half. Drawing inspiration from albums such as The Who's Quadrophenia and Green Day's American Idiot, it was expected to have over 30 tracks. Tommy (also by The Who), Pink Floyd's The Wall and Canadian band The Kings have also been mentioned as influences. The rock opera had its story written with help from Hugo Possolo and Marcelo Rubens Paiva. By April 2017, vocalist and bassist Branco Mello said a handful of tracks were ready.

Also in April, the band started a tour called "Uma Noite no Teatro" (A Night at the Theater). The tour included three new songs: "Me Estuprem" (Rape Me), about sexual harassment and rape; "12 Flores Amarelas" (12 Yellow Flowers); and "A Festa" (The Party). By that time, none of them were expected to be on the album. On 23 September, however, the band performed them again during their show at the Rock in Rio 7, and this time they were announced as part of the new project.

In December 2017, they announced that they had already started recording the album and that it would be released via Universal Music Brazil. On January 31, they announced its title and that it would be released in early 2018.

In April, the final track listing of the album had 25 songs.

The album was partially funded by Universidade Estácio de Sá, via the Rouanet Law, and the whole project took two and a half years to be finished.

In interviews, the band members said that the idea to create a rock opera was born out of the wish to do something different from what they were doing until then.

== Release and promotion ==
The album was released throughout three weeks, one act at a time. The first release was expected for 14 April, but was pushed back to 27 of the same month.

=== Controversy ===
Titãs promoted the album as the first rock opera by a Brazilian band, but such information is contested. Musical producer Pedro Eleftheriou states that, in the end of the eighties, the group III Milênio (now disbanded and at that time known as Ano Luz) released a rock opera called Aliança dos Tempos (Alliance of the Times). In response to such questioning, Titãs stated:

As far as Titãs know, this was really the first rock opera made by a rock band, but they never stated that. They always said, including in interviews, that there is the one by Arrigo Barnabé [2015's O Homem dos Crocodilos (The Man of Crocodiles)]. If this man's [Eleftheriou] production titled itself as such [rock opera], we never came to know it, because it wasn't something publicized.

Other albums by Brazilian artists released before Doze Flores Amarelas are also considered rock operas, such as O Filho de José e Maria (1977), by Odair José; Bigorna (2002), by Cartoon; and The Man Who Died Everyday (2013), by Dusty Old Fingers.

=== Spectacle ===
Doze Flores Amarelas was presented live in a spectacle event that mixed elements of theater, music and cinema and was directed by Possolo and Otávio Juliano. Rita Lee narrates the story, connecting the tracks. According to Mello, Possolo brought the theater perspective, and Juliano, the cinema's.

About Rita Lee's guest performance, Bellotto said:

Think of it: it's the first Brazilian rock opera, the queen of Brazilian rock is Rita Lee, the main theme is the women matter, and she was already a feminist before the movement became a trend. Since the beginning Lee stood her ground in the sexist world of rock and roll with much personality, so it was a convergence of factors.

The show features the guest performances of actresses Corina Sabbas, Cyntia Mendes, Yas Werneck and two other actors. Mendes was already involved with rock and roll and Sabbas with musicals, while Werneck came from the hip hop world. The three were selected after auditions and all of them stated they've already been sexually harassed at work or by their own boyfriends. According to the band, with their arrival to the project, some lyrics were changed according to their inputs. The members also lauded the participation of other women in the project, such as producer Ângela Figueiredo, careographer Olivia Branco and codirector Luciana Ferraz.

The show's scenery includes screens for the projection of various backgrounds and for the emulation of social media posts and it was set by Branco. The show had its premiere at Centro Cultural Teatro Guaíra, during Festival de Teatro de Curitiba, and then headed to other Brazilian cities, starting with São Paulo, on 12 April. Due to the project's complexity, the tour will only take the band to places with enough infrastructure to host the spectacle.

In July 2018, it was announced that the spectacle would be released in DVD format in August, with the tracks being also released at digital platforms. The DVD version was recorded during a season at Teatro Opus, at Shopping Villa Lobos, in São Paulo, and features some unique details in the scenery and in the projections. Due to a setback, the band had to record the show twice, once with and once without the audience. The tour is expected to continue throughout the year of 2019.

Amidst the tour and after the DVD recording, Mello was diagnosed with a tumour in his larynx, which forced him off stage for three months, a period in which he was replaced by the band's former session bassist Lee Marcucci.

== Lyrics and composition ==
=== Plot ===
Doze Flores Amarelas tells the story of three "calouras" (Maria A, Maria B, Maria C, conceived as alteregos of the three Titãs) who use a fictional app (Facilitador ("Facilitator")) to find a party to go. The app recommends them to a college party, which they attend dressed as witches. At the event, they end up raped by five classmates, with the crime resulting in consequences for all eight of them. Each of the three Marias deals with the happening in their own way: Maria A (Maria Alice) finds out she's pregnant of one of the rapists and is torn between aborting or giving birth and raising the child. Meanwhile, she hopes her father, a priest, can comfort her. Maria B has strong vengeance wishes and Maria C, besides falling in love with one of the criminals, is unsure at first whether they were really raped or not. The three end up joining forces for a vengeance carried out with the aid of a mortal spell suggested by the app itself and that involves twelve yellow flowers.

The album deals with themes such as violence, harassment, parents-children relationships, vengeance, hatred, passion, drugs, addiction to technology and its impact in people's lifes. The album's style goes from punk rock to acoustic, including orchestrated tracks, pop music, grunge, jazz and stoner rock.

When the band decided to make a rock opera, they wanted to tell a story involving a college group and found at sexual violence a trigger for many topics.

Mello says family experiences influenced the work:

What changed today in the youth is the technology part, which totally changed, the drugs are even different, so it's good to be contact [sic] with this reality of our children and even with our grandchildren. But there's a lot that's unchanged, such as the relation between a father and a son, the necessary talks. There's the more liberal and the more repressive father. We tried to put all of this in the spectacle's subject-matter.

=== Place of speech ===
On the fact that an all-male band is dealing with female themes, vocalist, keyboardist and bassist Sérgio Britto stated:

It wasn't a premeditated [choice], this is a theme that touches us, that concerns us as men. [...] It's a topic that is gaining visibility, but unfortunately it's part of the sexism society [sic] in Brazil, not to mention Latin America, and in the whole world, even in the best places there are horrible stories. I find it execrable this thing of believing women are objects and that you can dispose of them. It's good that men are aware that this is an aberration and that women are aware that they can get up and claim [their rights].

Bellotto also expressed his opinion on the matter, stating:

We knew that (the project) would generate discussion. It's not always possible to please everyone. But, if we couldn't tell this story with female characters, the work would be extremely limited. In this case, any other story that wasn't about mid-life rockers could also be considered illegitimate. We were as careful as possible and decided to try and convince people that this is not a problem.

Possolo added: "I find it important that we, men, can side with women, who are absolutely right about claiming their rights. The artist, the poet, is a 'pretender', so he has to 'pretend to be feeling this pain' and share it with a part of society."

Mello reminded that the band's previous album, Nheengatu (2014), already dealt with delicate topics such as pedophilia, racism and violence against women itself.

=== Title ===
The album was originally going to be titled Três Marias (Three Marias), but the band considered it a little bit cliché. They opted to adopt the name of one of the tracks, which title refers to a spell the protagonists prepare during the plot. According to Bellotto, "it's an original name, that refers to women and to magic a little bit, and it's also poetic, because you don't know exactly what it is talking about, but you know there's something interesting there."

== Track listing ==
Act I
No.	Title	Writer(s)	Lead vocals	Length
1.	"Abertura" (Opening)	Sérgio Britto, Tony Bellotto, Branco Mello, Jaques Morelenbaum, Hugo Possolo	Instrumental; narration by Rita Lee	1:07
2.	"Nada nos Basta" (Nothing's Enough for Us)	Britto	Britto	3:24
3.	"O Facilitador" (The Facilitator)	Britto, Mello	Mello	2:01
4.	"Weird Sisters"	Britto	Britto	2:43
5.	"Disney Drugs"	Britto	Britto	2:52
6.	"A Festa" (The Party)	Britto, Mello	Mello	3:20
7.	"Fim de Festa" (Party's End)	Bellotto, Mello, Britto	Mello	3:24
8.	"Me Estuprem" (Rape Me)	Britto, Bellotto	Britto	2:53
Total length:				21:44

Act II
No.	Title	Writer(s)	Lead vocals	Length
9.	"Interlúdio 1" (Interlude 1)	Britto, Bellotto, Possolo	Instrumental; narration by Rita Lee	1:07
10.	"O Bom Pastor" (The Good Priest)	Bellotto, Britto, Mello	Mello, Britto	2:23
11.	"Eu Sou Maria" (I Am Maria)	Britto, Bellotto	Britto, Mello	5:03
12.	"Canção da Vingança" (Revenge Song)	Britto, Beto Lee	Bellotto	2:10
13.	"Hoje" (Today)	Britto	Britto	2:00
14.	"Nossa Bela Vida" (Our Beautiful Life)	Bellotto	Britto	1:39
15.	"Personal Hater"	Britto, Mello	Mello	1:29
16.	"Interlúdio 2" (Interlude 2)	Britto, Mello, Bellotto, Lee, Morelenbaum, Possolo	Instrumental; narration by Rita Lee	0:36
17.	"De Janeiro até Dezembro" (From January to December)	Bellotto	Mello	1:28
18.	"Mesmo Assim" (Still)	Britto	Britto	3:26
19.	"Não Sei" (I Don't Know)	Bellotto, Britto	Britto	1:51
20.	"Essa Gente Tem Que Morrer" (These People've Got to Die)	Britto, Mário Fabre	Britto, Mello	2:53
Total length:				26:08

Act III
No.	Title	Writer(s)	Lead vocals	Length
21.	"Interlúdio 3" (Interlude 3)	Britto, Morelenbaum, Possolo	Instrumental; narration by Rita Lee	1:07
22.	"Me Chamem de Veneno" (Call Me Poison)	Mello, Britto, Bellotto, Lee	Mello	3:30
23.	"Doze Flores Amarelas" (Twelve Yellow Flowers)	Britto, Mello, Bellotto, Lee	Britto, Mello	4:10
24.	"Ele Morreu" (He Died)	Bellotto, Britto	Britto, Corina Sabbas, Cyntia Mendes, Yás Werneck	2:15
25.	"Pacto de Sangue" (Blood Pact)	Britto	Sabbas, Mendes, Werneck	1:51
26.	"O Jardineiro" (The Gardener)	Mello, Britto, Bellotto	Mello	2:25
27.	"Réquiem" (Requiem)	Britto, Bellotto, Mello, Fabre	Mello	3:01
28.	"É Você" (It's You)	Britto	Britto	3:23
29.	"Sei que Seremos" (I Know We Will Be)	Britto, Bellotto, Mello	Sabbas, Mendes, Werneck	2:06
Total length:				23:48

== Critical reception ==
=== Spectacle reception ===
Professional ratings
Review scores
Source	Rating
Teatro em Cena	Mixed
Gazeta do Povo	Slightly favorable

On the website Teatro em Cena, journalist Leonardo Torres criticised the plot's narrative thread, calling it "fragile and superficial" due to it losing focus and diverting "to other themes without managing to deal with all of them". He believes the work could improve if around ten songs were removed and considers the narrations "expendable and redundant". He also criticised specifically the transition between tracks, done in a manner incompatible with a theater spectacle and considered the songs little "contagious or memorable".

Another aspect criticised by Torres was the role of the three actresses. According to him, they are almost always shown behind the musicians, barely having lights on them and having very little space to speak, while the band takes on the lead role on a female topic in a story created by a 100% male team, including singing lyrics written from female perspectives.

Sandro Moser, from Gazeta do Povo, congratulated the band and all other personnel involved for the project's boldness, while also criticising the transition between tracks and the absence of a great moment. He also missed former member Paulo Miklos, an experienced actor.

== Personnel ==
- Branco Mello – Lead vocals on tracks 3, 7, 10, 17, 22, 26 and 27, co-lead vocals on tracks 6, 11, 15, 20 and 23, backing vocals on tracks 2, 4, 5, 8, 13, 14, 18, 19, 25 and 28, bass on tracks 1, 2, 4–9, 11–16, 18–21, 23–25, 28 and 29
- Sérgio Britto – Lead vocals on tracks 2, 4, 5, 8, 13, 14, 18, 19, 25 and 28, co-lead vocals on tracks 6, 11, 15, 20, 23 and 24, backing vocals on tracks 3, 7, 10, 17, 22, 26 and 27, keyboards on tracks 1, 4–6, 9, 11–16, 18–21, 23–25, 28 and 29, piano on track 7, acoustic guitar on tracks 2 and 8, bass on tracks 3, 7, 10, 17, 22, 26 and 27
- Tony Bellotto – Lead and rhythm guitars on all tracks, lead vocals on track 12

Session members

- Yas Werneck, Cyntia Mendes e Corina Sabbas – Co-lead vocals on tracks 24 and 29 (respectively as Maria A, Maria B and Maria C)
- Beto Lee – Rhythm and lead guitars on all tracks
- Mario Fabre – Drums on all tracks

=== Guests ===
- Jaques Morelenbaum – strings arrangement
- Rita Lee – narrations on tracks 1, 9, 16 and 21
