= Otávio Juliano =

Brazilian director and filmmaker (born 1972)

Otavio Juliano
- Born: 1972; São Paulo, Brazil
- Occupation(s): Film Director, Television producer

Otavio Juliano (born 1972 in São Paulo) is a Brazilian director and filmmaker. He is the second of three children in a family of Italian descent. Juliano is an alumnus of the UCLA Ext. School of Theater Film and Television. He started his career acting in theater.

== Works ==
- The Music Tree A Árvore da Música (Brazilian title) features the plight of the brazilwood, the species of tree that gave Brazil its name, and whose unique deep red wood is used in the manufacture of bows for fine violins and similar instruments. Its current endangered status represents a serious threat to classical music worldwide, as there is no other material that can be used to make bows of comparable quality. The film screened in more than 22 film festivals around the world and Otavio Juliano received the Polly Krakora Award for artistry in film at the DC Environmental Film Festival. The film received awards on Portugal, Brazil and US. Joshua Bell, David Garret and Antonio Meneses perform on the film.
- A documentary about Brazilian heavy metal band Sepultura, premiered in Los Angeles in 2017, SEPULTURA ENDURANCE. The film was selected for film festivals around the world, such as Mar del Plata International Film Festival, Ambulante Mexico and InEdit.
- A documentary about Brazilian heavy metal band Sepultura, premiered in Los Angeles in 2017, SEPULTURA ENDURANCE. The film was selected for film festivals around the world, such as Mar del Plata International Film Festival, Ambulante Mexico and InEdit.
- Brazilian TV series Exilio e Canções, hosted by Sérgio Britto Titãs, a TV Brasil/ Interface Filmes production.
- Third World California depicts the subhuman conditions experienced by undocumented immigrants living in "Duroville", a settlement largely composed of decrepit trailer homes and lacking basic infrastructure. Its location within the Torres-Martinez Indian Reservation in California's Colorado Desert exempts it from many federal and state laws, which allows some Torres-Martinez tribe members to profiteer from the situation of the undocumented workers, and to disregard environmental and safety regulations in force elsewhere. The film debuted in the 22nd Chicago Latino Film Festival in 2006.
- Directed Music Videos for Sergio Britto (Titãs) and Rita Lee and many other music artists.
- Created Video Design with Interface Filmes/Luciana Ferraz for Theater and Broadway Musicals in Brazil, such as Chaplin, The Wizard Of Oz, Evita and Singing in the Rain.
- Co-directed the stage musical Doze Flores Amarelas, rock opera from the Brazilian band Titãs. Universal Music Group released the rock opera's DVD by October 2018, also directed by Otavio Juliano along with Luciana Ferraz.
- Titãs Encontro tour: Creative/Artistic Director and stage designer.
