= Destination Tennis =

American television series

- Genre: Sports
- Starring: Mayleen Ramey; Mieke Buchan
- Country of origin: United States

Original release
- Network: Tennis Channel
- Release: 2006 – present

Destination Tennis is a television series hosted by Mayleen Ramey, and Mieke Buchan who travel to different tennis courts around the world. Places visited include Las Vegas, Nevada, Palm Springs, California, and Australia. The series airs on the Tennis Channel.
