= Beto Lee =

Brazilian singer and guitarist

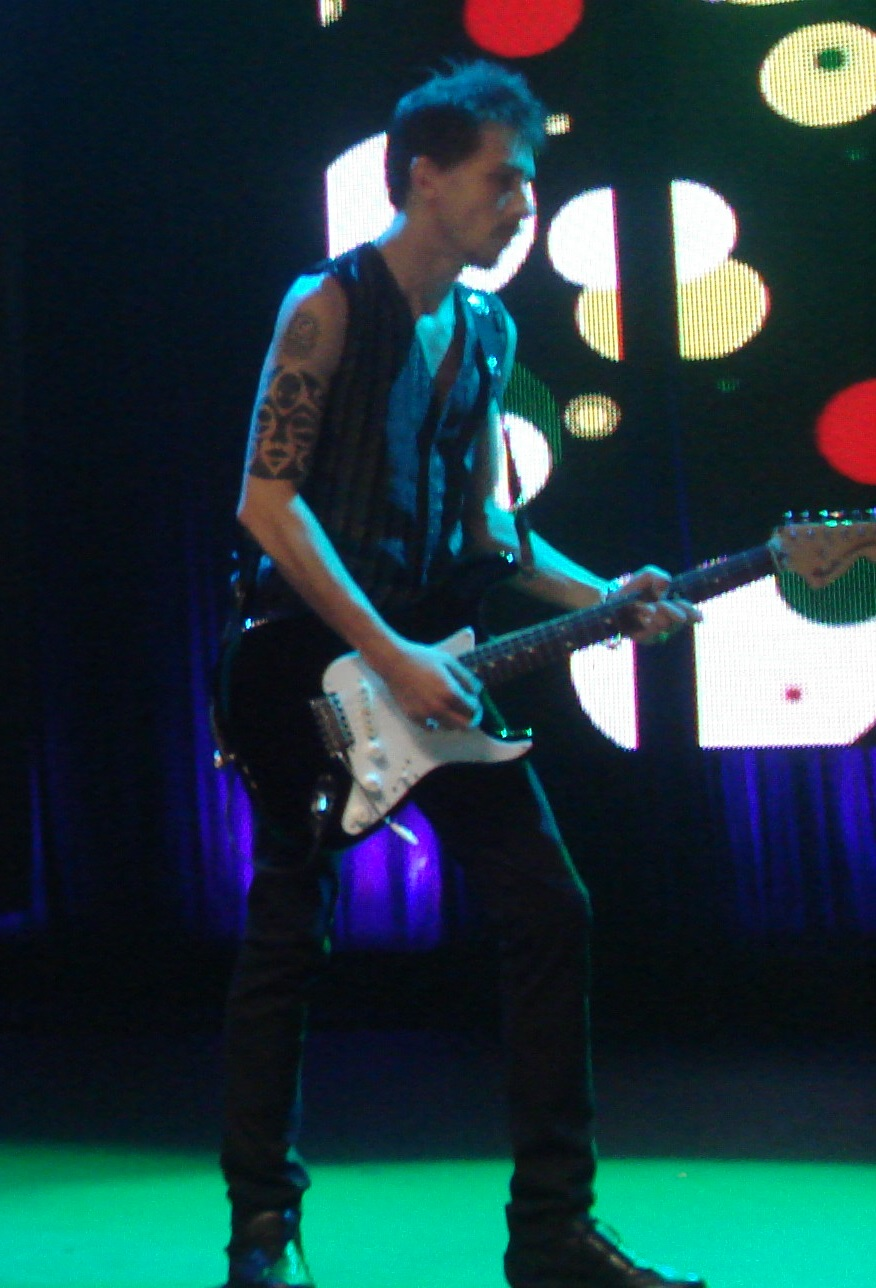
- Lee performing in 2009 with his mother

Background information
- Born: Roberto Lee de Carvalho; 21 March 1977 (age 48); São Paulo, Brazil
- Genres: Rock
- Occupations: Singer, guitarist, composer, songwriter
- Instruments: Vocals, guitar
- Years active: 1995–present

Roberto Lee de Carvalho (born 21 March 1977), more commonly known as Beto Lee, is a Brazilian singer-songwriter and guitarist, currently a session member of Titãs. He has also co-founded Galaxy and has released two solo albums, one of them earning a Latin Grammy Award. He is the son of singer-songwriter Rita Lee and guitarist Roberto de Carvalho.

== Career ==
In 1998, his song "O Gosto do Azedo", with lyrics dealing with struggles of HIV positive people to mingle, was recorded by his mother Rita Lee, on her Acústico MTV album. The song earned him a Sheila Cortopassi Award for the Art category. The award is provided by APTA (Associação para Prevenção e Tratamento da Aids; Portuguese for "AIDS Treatment and Prevention Association") for people and institutions with remarkable AIDS-related contributions throughout the year.

In 2002, he released his debut solo album, Todo Mundo É Igual, featuring Gabriel o Pensador, Itamar Assumpção and Carlos Rennó.

In 2004, he established the Galaxy trio and released a self-titled album with them via Astronauta Discos.

In 2010, Lee started work on his second solo album, Celebração & Sacrifício, produced by Tadeu Patolla (Charlie Brown Jr./ Biquini Cavadão) and featuring Kiko Zambianchi, Supla and Skowa (Skowa e a Máfia). The album was released in 2011 and in 2012 it received the Latin GrammyAward for Best Portuguese Language Rock or Alternative Album.

In July 2016, he joined São Paulo rock band Titãs as their session guitarist, replacing founding member Paulo Miklos, who wanted to focus on personal projects after 34 years with the group. Along with remaining members Branco Mello, Sérgio Britto and Tony Bellotto, as well as session drummer Mário Fabre, he resumed the Nheengatu promotional tour and later released the rock opera Doze Flores Amarelas.

In August 2017, Lee and fellow musicians Diego Guimarães and Edu Salvitti founded production company Trio Music, focusing on publicity, project creation, cultural contents, cinema and television soundtracks and original albums.

=== Galaxy ===
Galaxy
- Origin: São Paulo, Brazil
- Genres: Rock
- Years active: 2004–present
- Label: Astronauta Discos
- Members: Beto Lee; Gonzales; Edu Salvitti

Galaxy was formed by Beto Lee along with Edu Salvitti (drums) and Gonzales (bass). They released an album in 2004 via Astronauta Discos (Rio de Janeiro), titled Galaxy, which was promoted without the use of payolas and with some shows around the state of São Paulo.

The album featured songs such as "Dicionário Brasileiro", written by Otto, and covers of "Agora Ninguém Chora Mais", by Jorge Ben Jor, and "No Fun", by Iggy Pop and The Stooges.

== Discography ==
=== Solo career ===
- 2002 – Todo Mundo É Igual
- 2011 – Celebração & Sacrifício

=== With Galaxy ===
- 2004 – Galaxy

=== With Rita Lee ===
- 1998 – Acústico MTV (CD e DVD)
- 2000 – 3001 (CD)
- 2003 – Balacobaco (CD)
- 2004 – MTV Ao Vivo (CD e DVD)
- 2007 – Biograffiti (DVD)
- 2009 – Multishow Ao Vivo (CD e DVD )

=== With Titãs ===
- 2018 — Doze Flores Amarelas
- 2020 — Titãs Trio Acústico
- 2022 — Olho Furta-Cor

== Awards and nominations ==
| Year | Award | Category | Work | Outcome | Ref. |
|---|---|---|---|---|---|
| 1998 | Sheila Cortopassi Award | Art | Song "O Gosto do Azedo" | Won | |
| 2012 | Latin Grammy | Best Portuguese Language Rock or Alternative Album | Album Celebração & Sacrifício | Won | |
