= Third World California =

Third World California is a 2006 documentary film by Otavio Juliano. It depicts the substandard living conditions of undocumented immigrants living within an Indian reservation in the Lower Coachella Valley in the California desert. Because of the reservation's status as a sovereign entity, environmental regulations, building codes, fire safety codes and other basic legal protections cannot be enforced there. As a result, the undocumented residents of the reservation live in squalor next to mounds of sewage sludge, enduring some of the highest summer temperatures in the world in metal trailers without air-conditioning or reliable plumbing, all the while being charged high rentals by their tribal member landlords.

The film debuted at the 22nd Chicago Latino Film Festival.
