= Beverly's Full House =

American reality documentary television series

- Genre: Documentary
- Starring: Beverly Johnson
- Country of origin: United States
- Original language: English
- No. of seasons: 1
- No. of episodes: 8

Production
- Executive producers: Beverly Johnson; Jason Carbone; Nick Lee
- Running time: 40–43 minutes
- Production company: Good Clean Fun

Original release
- Network: Oprah Winfrey Network
- Release: March 31 – May 19, 2012

Beverly's Full House is an American reality documentary television series that debuted March 31, 2012, on the Oprah Winfrey Network with 388,000 total viewers. Kuyavia

== Overview ==
The series follows the family life of supermodel Beverly Johnson as she tries to bring three generations of her fragmented family together under one roof: her own home in the resort city of Palm Springs, California.

== Cast ==
- Beverly Johnson
- Anansa Sims
- David Patterson
- Robert Dupont
- Nikki Haskell
- Brian Maillian

== Episodes ==
No.	Title	Original release date
1	"Moving In Is Hard To Do"	March 31, 2012
2	"Supermodel Behavior"	April 7, 2012
3	"You Can't Have Your Cake and Eat It Too"	April 14, 2012
4	"Mother Knows Best"	April 21, 2012
5	"Working It Out"	April 28, 2012
6	"Give Me A Break"	May 5, 2012
7	"Rules of Engagement"	May 12, 2012
8	"I Do Or I Don't"	May 19, 2012
