= Compton House =

Compton House may refer to:

== In England ==
- Compton House, a mansion in Over Compton, Dorset
- Compton Beauchamp House, a mansion in Oxfordshire
- Compton House, in Wentworth, Virginia Water, Surrey - where Prajadhipok, King of Siam lived, and died in 1941
- Compton Wynyates, a Tudor country house in Warwickshire
- Compton Verney House, a mansion in Warwickshire
- Compton Park House, Compton Chamberlayne or Compton House, a country house in Wiltshire
- Compton House, Liverpool, a department store built in 1867

== In the United States ==
- The Arthur H. Compton House, Chicago, Illinois
- The David Compton House, Mauricetown, New Jersey
- The Captain Edward Compton House, Mauricetown, New Jersey
- The Compton-Wood House, Little Rock, Arkansas
