= Abraham and Ann Hoy House =

Coordinates: 39.28402°N 74.99384°W

The Abraham and Ann Hoy House is a vernacular building, located in Mauricetown, Cumberland County, New Jersey, constructed around 1860. It is owned by the Mauricetown Historical Society.

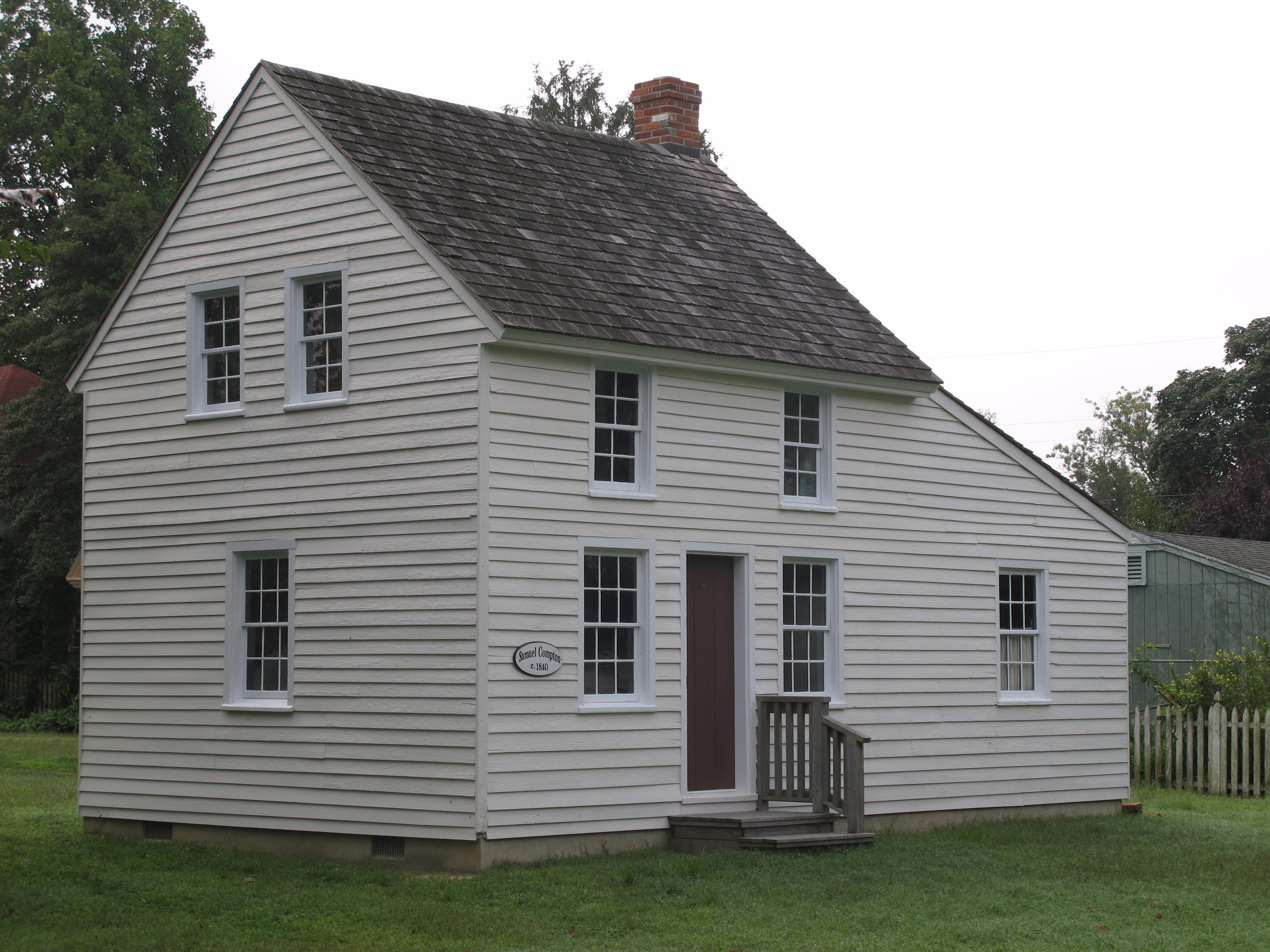
Abraham and Ann Hoy House, Mauricetown, Cumberland County, New Jersey

== Property history ==
Currently, the Hoy House shares a lot with the Captain Edward Compton House, the headquarters of the Mauricetown Historical Society. Despite this, the house was originally located on a small lot on the east side of Buckshutem Road (County Route 670). Several years ago, the dwelling was moved from its original location after being purchased by the Historical Society.

The property on which the Hoy House once stood dates back to 1820, when George Elkington willed more than 15 acres to his wife's niece, Elizabeth Compton. No information exists to suggest that a house stood on the lot prior to 1860.

In 1850, Abraham Hoy, a waterman of lower economic standing, lived with his family in Maurice River Township. At that time, he owned no real estate. In 1860, however, Abraham Hoy and his son-in-law Nathan S. Haley purchased 34 square rods of land from Charles and Mary Fagan for $65. Within the same year, the house was built on the lot and the Hoy family relocated to Mauricetown. According to the 1860 population census, Abraham Hoy, his wife Ann, and their five children resided in the house. When Hoy died in 1866, his estate was insolvent and the Orphans’ Court ordered a sale of the property, after which Nathan S. Haley became seized of the house and lot. A probate inventory taken at the time of Hoy's death indicates that the dwelling had a “kitchen,” “room,” and “chamber,” just as it does today.

Sometime during the late 19th or early 20th century, the Hoy House underwent a renovation in which several additions and a front porch were added, and the building was re-clad in asphalt siding. In 2010, the Mauricetown Historical Society facilitated the process to restore the dwelling to its original form, and is currently being used as an exhibit space.

== Notable architectural details ==
The two-story frame dwelling is significant as an example of a stack house, a popular vernacular residential type constructed throughout the mid-Atlantic during the 18th and 19th centuries. Alternately referred to as a “House and Garden,” “one-over-one house,” or “bandbox house,” this type is characterized by a single-pile block and a lack of ornamentation. Additionally, a stack house will feature additions to the main block, constructed concurrently or added over time.

The Hoy House consists of a one-pile main block with a shed kitchen addition, and is entirely clad in whitewashed clapboard siding. Wooden window and door surrounds are simple and painted green. Interior spaces follow suit, and are also devoid of ornament. A small winder stair is located on the fireplace wall, which is another feature typical of southern New Jersey stack houses. The garret space located above the shed kitchen retains some original timbers, mostly notably along the north, west, and east walls. Original timbers are mill sawn, with mortise and tenon joinery.
