= Captain Isaac Peterson House =

Historic house in New Jersey, US

Coordinates: 39.28575°N 74.99354°W

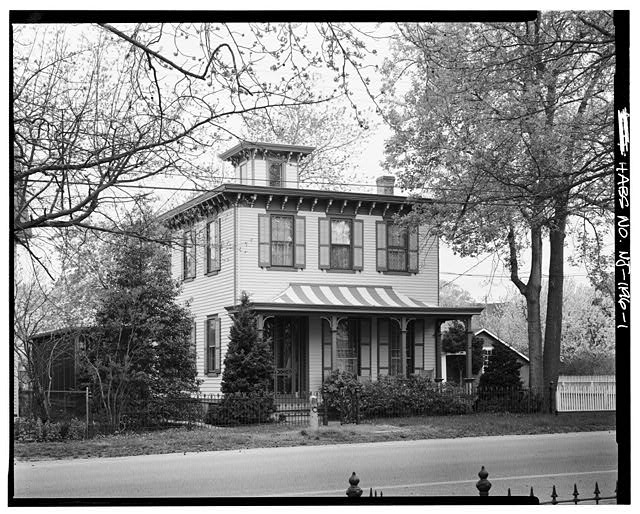
Captain Isaac Peterson House in 1991. Photographed for HABS/HAER survey.

The Captain Isaac Peterson House is an Italianate dwelling located in Mauricetown, Cumberland County, New Jersey, constructed around 1865 for a local sea captain and his family. It remains a private residence and is not open to the public.

== Architectural history ==
The structure is a three-bay, two-story, frame home, built on a double-pile side hall plan. There is a one-story kitchen wing, as well as an open porch, at the back of the house. There is also a large screened porch on the southern elevation. The front porch, originally adorned with intricate cast iron posts, features Victorian-inspired supports and a curved porch roof with joists reminiscent of a ship's framing in a nod to the house's namesake and Mauricetown's maritime history. Historically, there was a small sitting porch on the south elevation, but it was enclosed in the 1920s and made part of the interior living space. The home's exterior is covered in vinyl siding, and features ornate Italianate brackets and a reconstructed cupola crowning the hipped roof. The interior contains many original interior decorative details.

The Peterson House is nearly identical to the 1864 Captain Edward Compton House, which is located just up the street and houses the Mauricetown Historical Society. Although the Captain Edward Compton House no longer has its cupola, the two were near copies of each other at the time of construction, both in plan, massing, exterior appearance, and interior decoration. Samuel Cobb and Griffith Prichard, respectively the carpenter and builder for the Captain Edward Compton House, served the same positions in the Captain Peterson House's construction as well.

== Social history ==
Isaac Peterson (1832–1914) was a mariner and sea captain born and raised in southern New Jersey. In about 1852, he married Sarah Ann Lore. They had five children, two of whom died before the age of five. In 1864, they purchased the 21/100-acre plot in Mauricetown to build their house. Peterson was financially successful, and was known to travel to ports throughout the Atlantic and the Caribbean. His 1878 ship the Harry B. Ritter was of the most expensive ships built at the local J.W. Vannaman Shipyard. A member of Captain Peterson's immediate family owned the property until 1914, when his widow sold the property.

Several owners in the twentieth century carried on the tradition of working with maritime trades. Peterson's son, who owned the house with his wife from 1895 until his death in 1900, made his living through maritime work, and census records show that the next two owners, a father and son, were respectively a mariner and producer in the oyster industry. The current owners have focused their efforts on restoring the house to ensure its continued livability and legacy. Since purchasing the Captain Peterson House several decades ago, the owners have re-built and installed a cupola similar to the one seen in a 1910 postcard photograph, as well as made countless other as-needed alterations and renovations based on historic evidence and modern need.
