= Mauricetown, New Jersey =

Populated place in Cumberland County, New Jersey, US

- Census-designated place
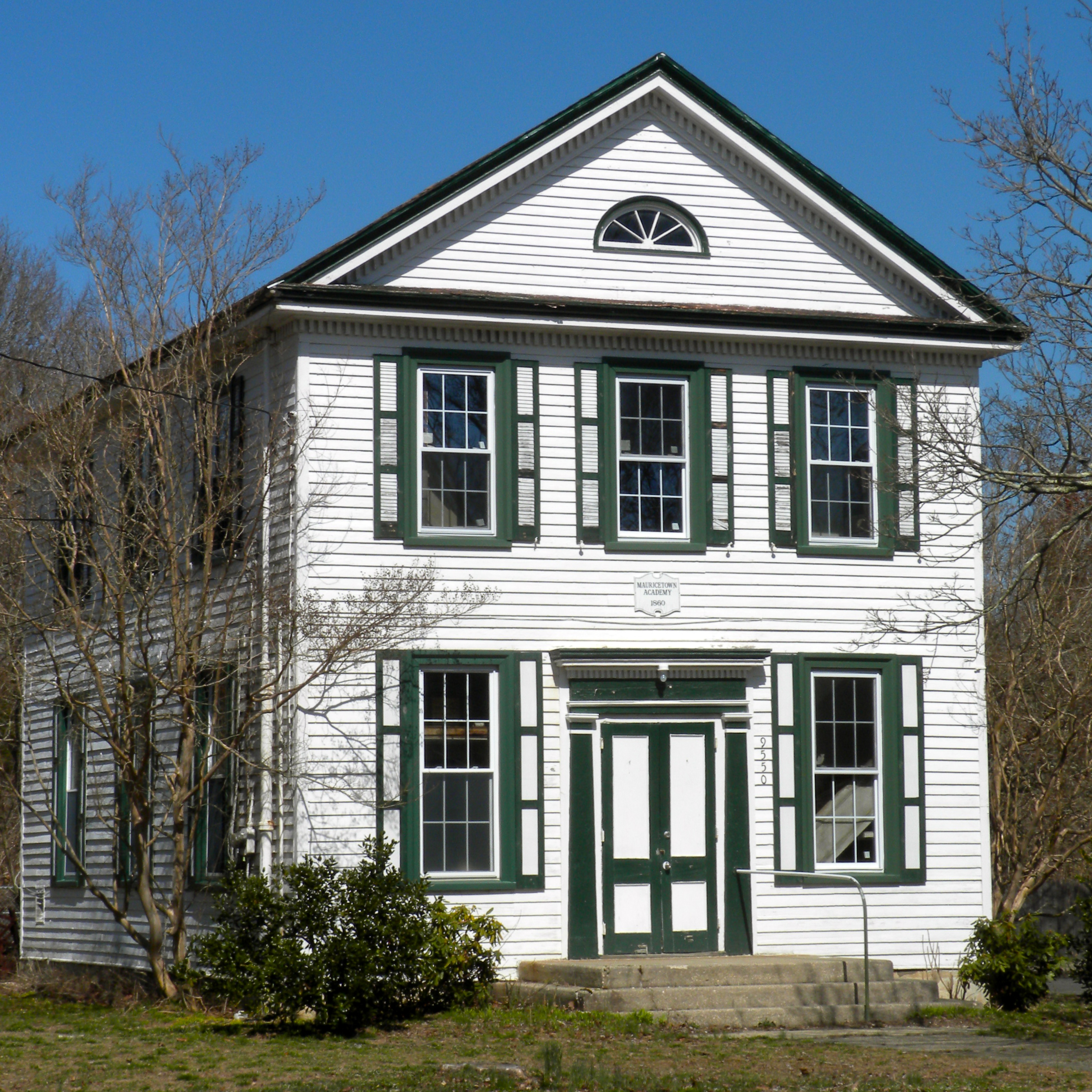
- Mauricetown Academy building

- Location in Cumberland County Location in New Jersey Location in the United States
- Coordinates: 39°17′09″N 74°59′36″W
- Country: United States
- State: New Jersey
- County: Cumberland
- Township: Commercial

Area
  - Total: 2.35 sq mi (6.08 km^{2})
  - Land: 2.11 sq mi (5.47 km^{2})
  - Water: 0.24 sq mi (0.61 km^{2})
- Elevation: 13 ft (4 m)

Population (2020)
  - Total: 403
  - Density: 190.8/sq mi (73.67/km^{2})
- ZIP Code: 08329
- FIPS code: 34-44670
- GNIS feature ID: 878200

Mauricetown (pronounced "Morristown") is a census-designated place and unincorporated community that is part of Commercial Township in Cumberland County, in the U.S. state of New Jersey.

The construction of County Route 649, a modern bypass road, has significantly reduced traffic through the community, resulting in a quiet, tranquil atmosphere with minimal automobile congestion. Mauricetown is a small, gridded town consisting of two main roads running east–west and three side streets running north–south, forming about 10 blocks of mostly residential buildings. The settlement is built on high ground overlooking the Maurice River, which supported Mauricetown's economic boom during the 19th century, when the community was active in coastal trade and shipbuilding. Mauricetown proper is surrounded on three sides by the grassy salt marshes, tidal flats, small creeks, and the Maurice River, and is located about 6 miles (9.7 km) upriver from the Delaware Bay. The building stock is mostly historic, with the large majority being houses built between 1790 and 1900. The Caesar Hoskins Log Cabin, one of the earliest buildings in Mauricetown and all of southern New Jersey, is listed on the National Register of Historic Places.

The area is served as United States Postal Service ZIP Code 08329. As of the 2020 United States census, the population for Mauricetown was 403. in the 2010 census the population for ZIP Code Tabulation Area 08329 was 221.

== Demographics ==
Historical population
| Census | Pop. | Note | %± |
|---|---|---|---|
| 2020 | 403 | | — |
U.S. Decennial Census; 2020

Mauricetown was first listed as a census designated place in the 2020 U.S. census.

Mauricetown CDP, New Jersey – Racial and ethnic composition Note: the US Census treats Hispanic/Latino as an ethnic category. This table excludes Latinos from the racial categories and assigns them to a separate category. Hispanics/Latinos may be of any race.
| Race / Ethnicity (NH = Non-Hispanic) | Pop 2020 | 2020 |
|---|---|---|
| White alone (NH) | 349 | 86.60% |
| Black or African American alone (NH) | 22 | 5.46% |
| Native American or Alaska Native alone (NH) | 0 | 0.00% |
| Asian alone (NH) | 1 | 0.25% |
| Native Hawaiian or Pacific Islander alone (NH) | 0 | 0.00% |
| Other race alone (NH) | 0 | 0.00% |
| Mixed race or Multiracial (NH) | 18 | 4.47% |
| Hispanic or Latino (any race) | 13 | 3.23% |
| Total | 403 | 100.00% |

As of 2020, the population was 403.

== Historic district ==
- Mauricetown Historic District
- U.S. National Register of Historic Places
- U.S. Historic district
- New Jersey Register of Historic Places
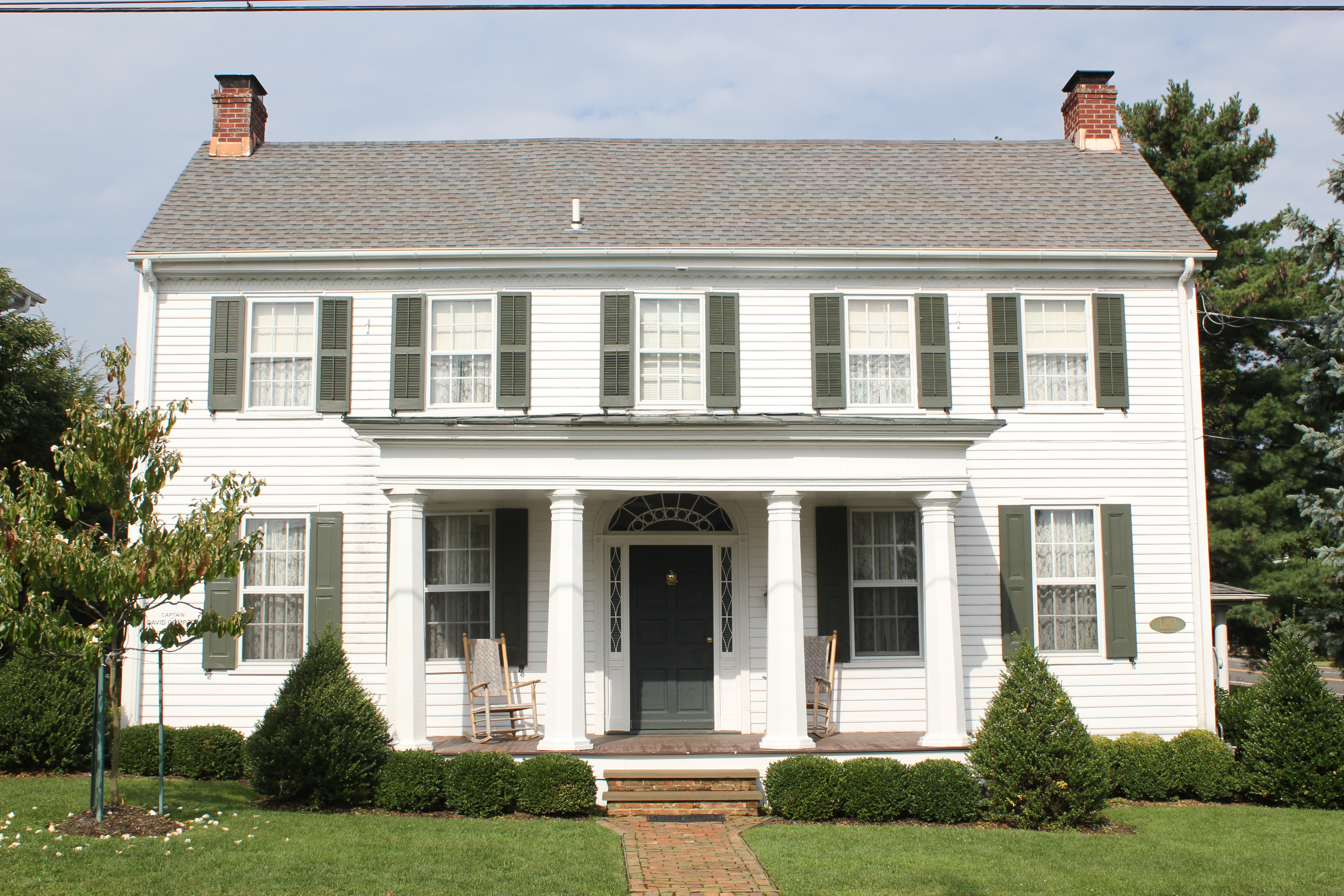
- David Compton House
- Location: Highland, Noble, Bacon, Front, and Stabe Streets, Buckshutem Road
- Area: 78.1 acres (31.6 ha)
- Architectural style: Federal, Gothic Revival, Greek Revival, Italianate, Bungalow
- NRHP reference No.: 100002252
- NJRHP No.: 4701

Significant dates
- Added to NRHP: March 29, 2018
- Designated NJRHP: January 30, 2018

The Mauricetown Historic District is a 78.1-acre (31.6 ha) historic district encompassing the community roughly along Highland Street. It was added to the National Register of Historic Places on March 29, 2018, for its significance in architecture, commerce, and maritime history from 1815 to 1930. The district includes 118 contributing buildings and one contributing structure. The Caesar Hoskins Log Cabin is part of the district.

== Notable buildings ==
- Abraham and Ann Hoy House
- Elkinton-Butcher House
- Captain Edward Compton House
- Captain Isaac Peterson House
- David Compton House
- James Compton House
- Mauricetown United Methodist Church
- Sharp-Mickle House
- John Wills House
- Hunter-Harris House
- Benjamin-Tomlin House

== Education ==
Students are zoned to Commercial Township School District.

== Gallery ==
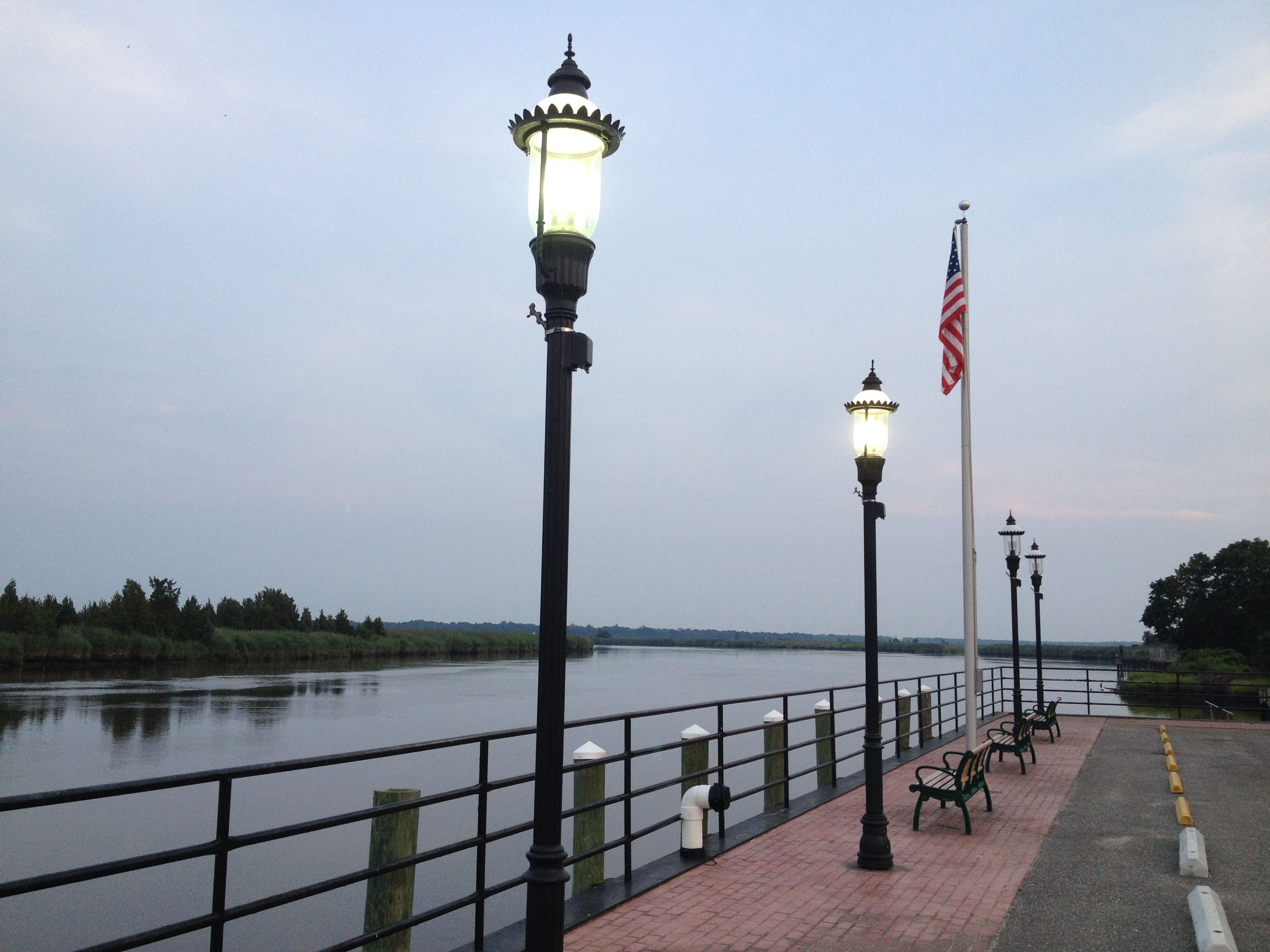
Waterfront Park on the Maurice River

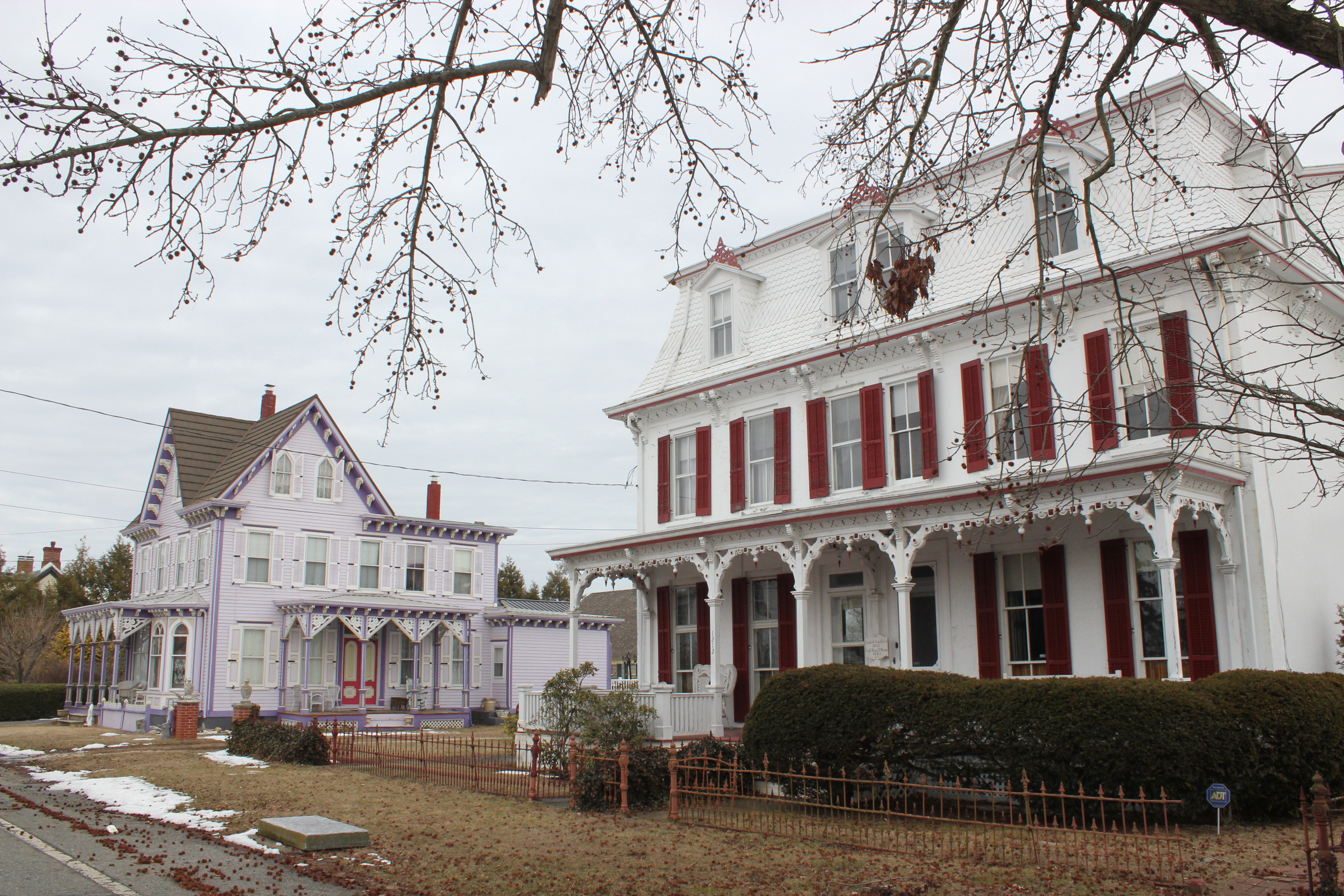
Sharp–Mickle and Compton–Bowen–Bacon Houses

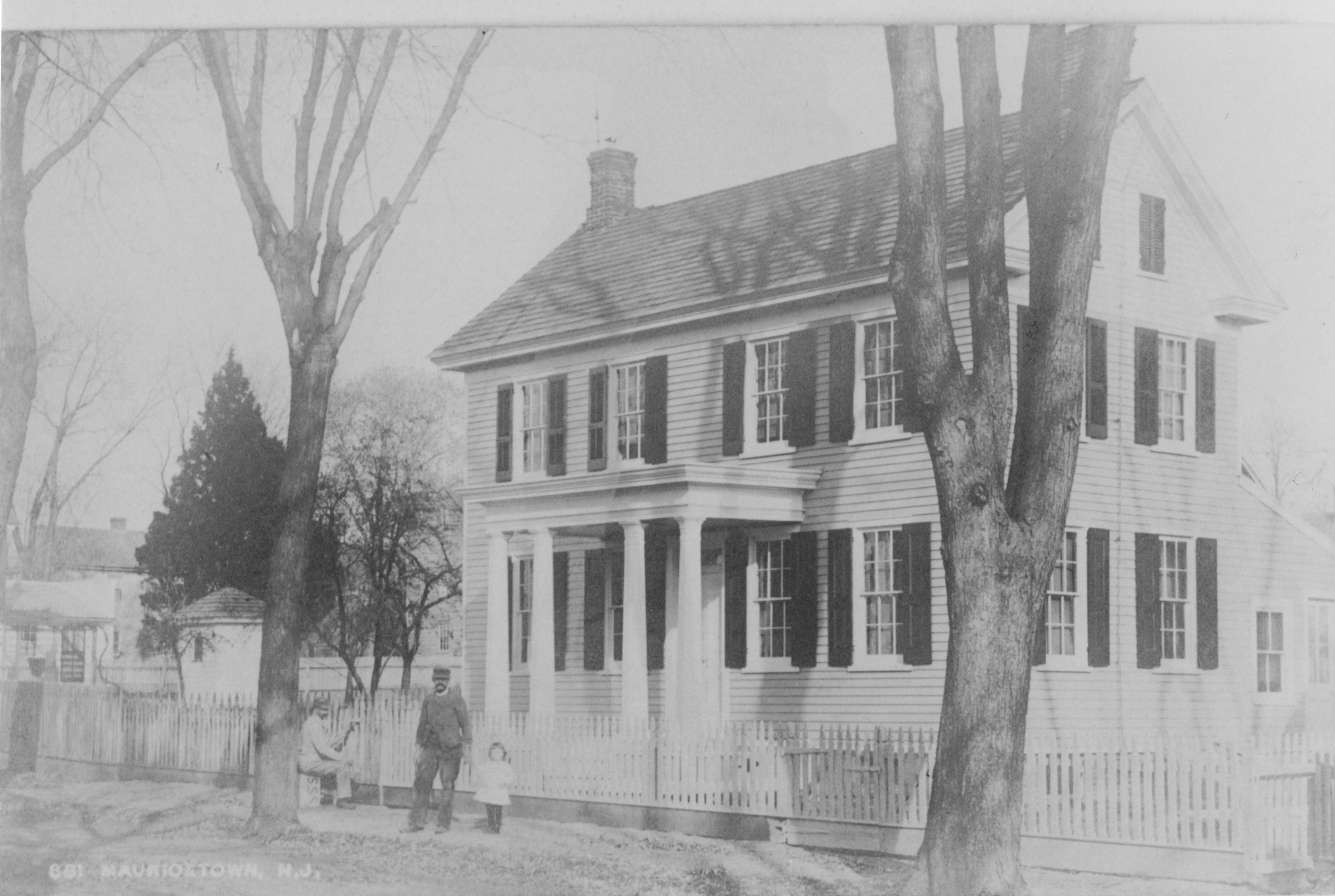
John Wills House

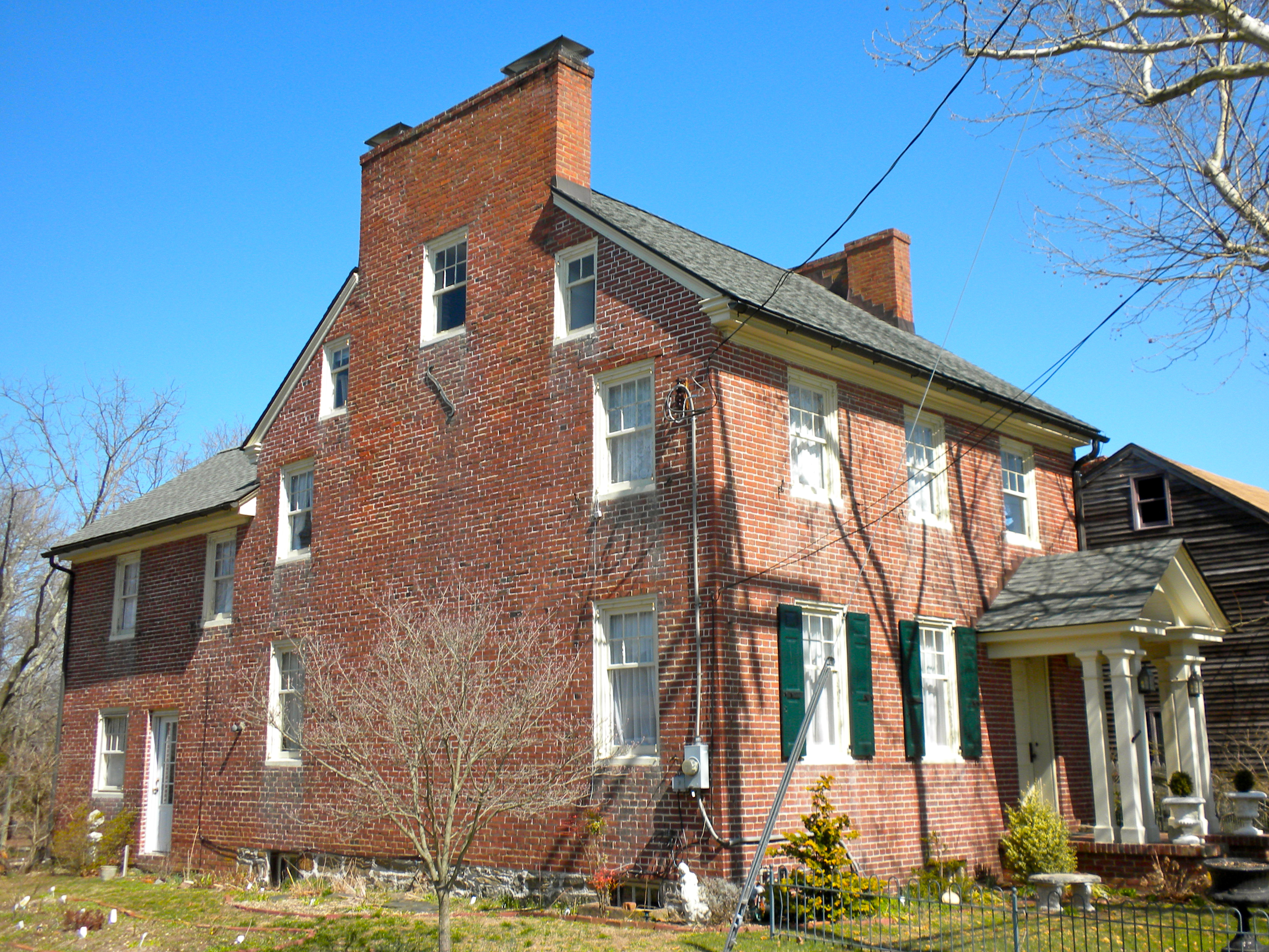
Elkinton–Butcher House

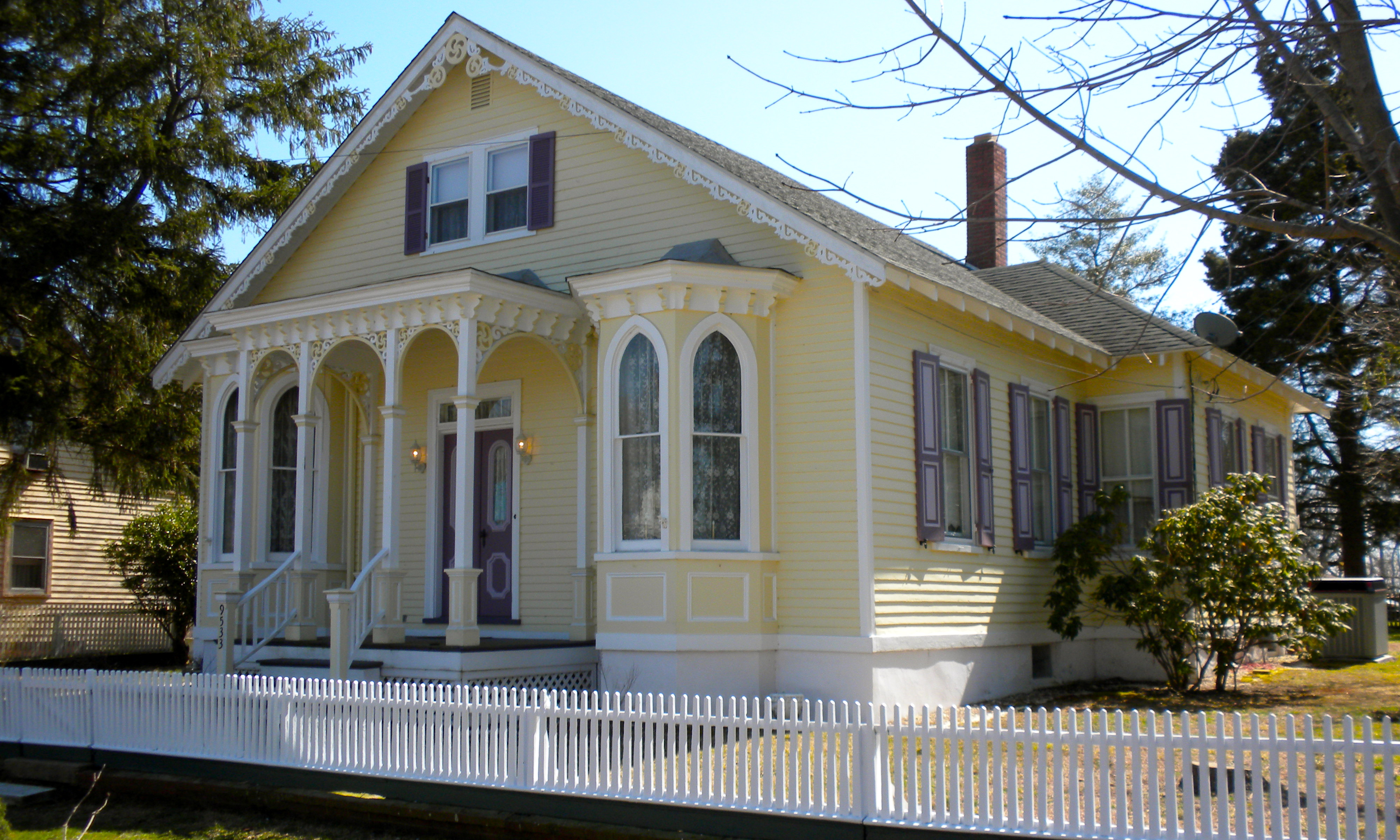
Captain Alfred Haley House

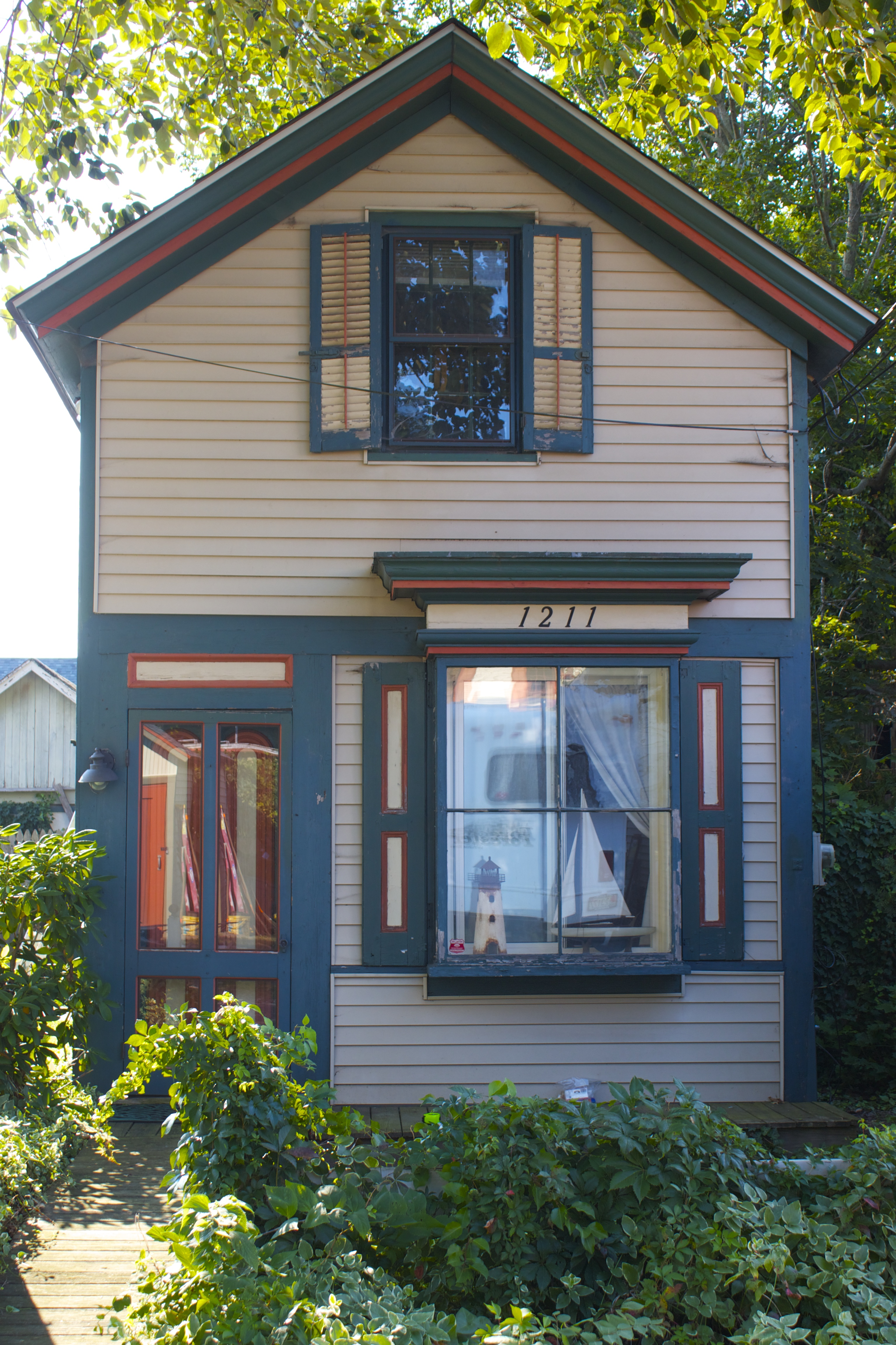
Hunter–Harris House

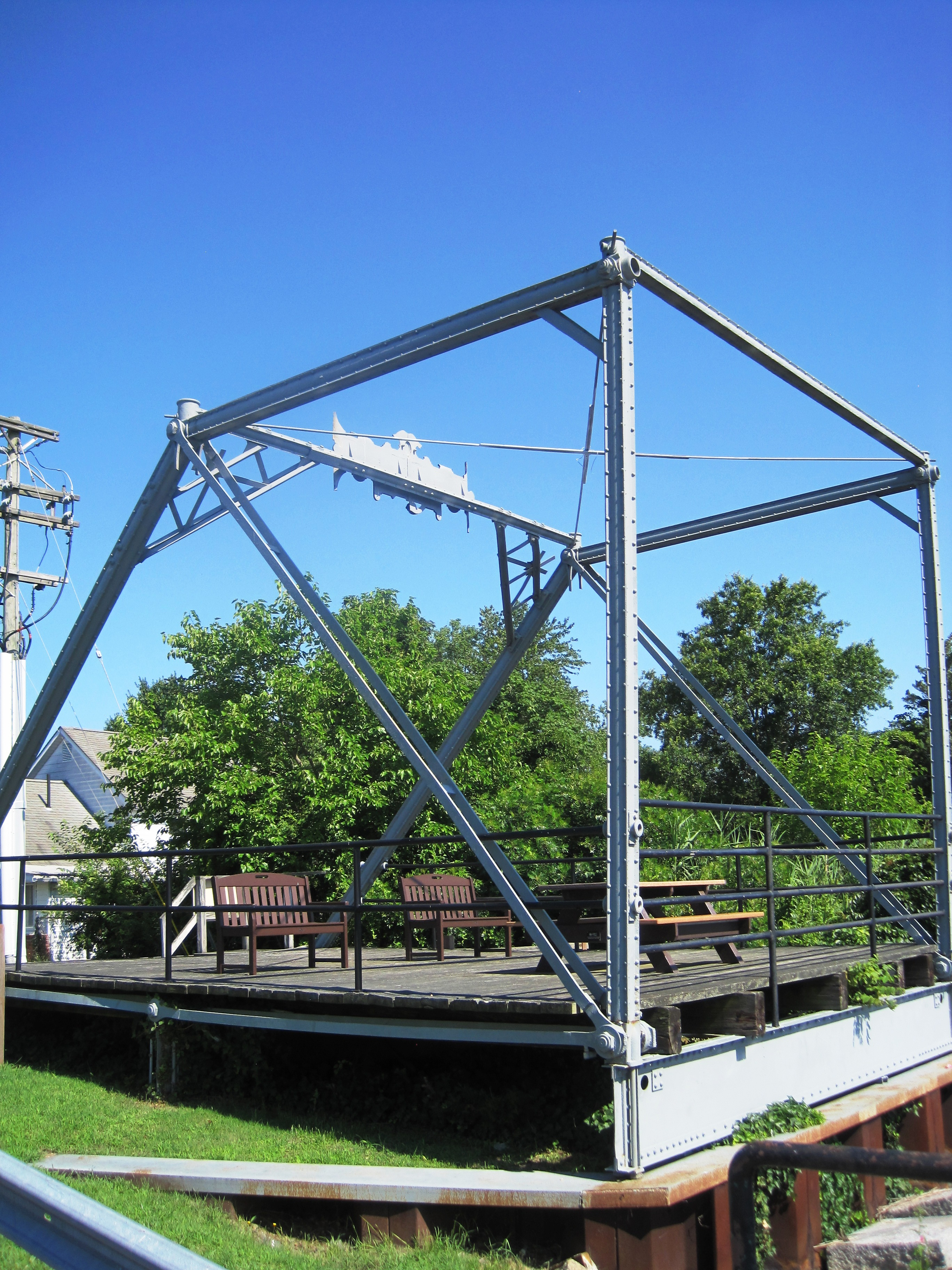
Preserved section of the Maurice River Pratt Through-Truss Swing Bridge

== Notable people ==
People who were born in, residents of, or otherwise closely associated with Mauricetown include:

- Henry C. Loudenslager (1852–1911), represented New Jersey's 1st congressional district from 1893 to 1911.
- Dallas Lore Sharp (1870–1929), author, naturalist and university professor.

== See also ==
- National Register of Historic Places listings in Cumberland County, New Jersey
