= Sharp-Mickle House =

House in New Jersey, US

Coordinates: 39°17′7.3″N 74°59′34.6″W

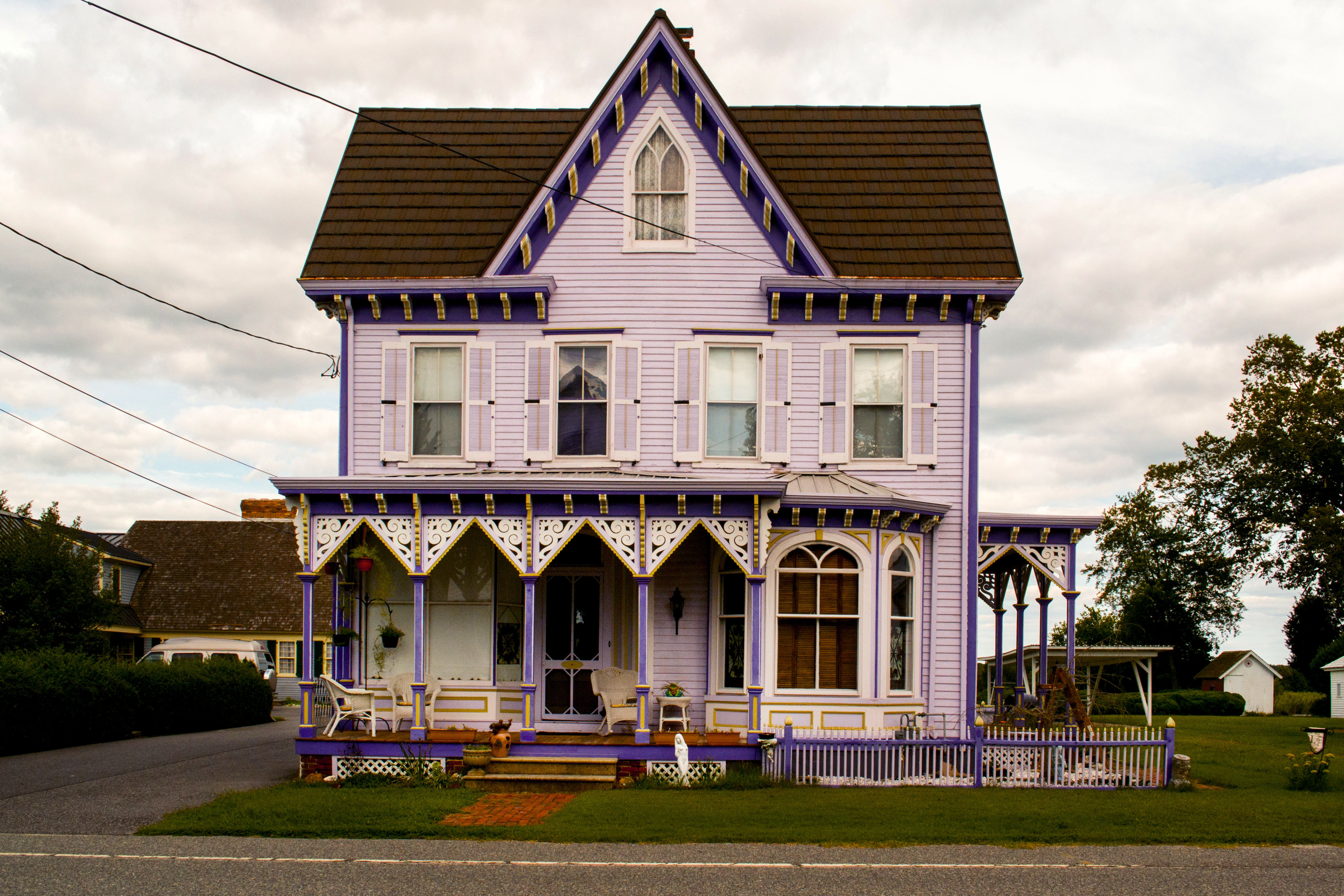
The Sharp-Mickle House is a Gothic Revival style dwelling constructed c.1820 in Mauricetown, NJ.

The Sharp-Mickle House is a Gothic Revival style dwelling located in Mauricetown, New Jersey, constructed around 1830 by landowner and farmer Seth Sharp. The building today resembles its appearance after its 1879 remodel by Samuel Mickle. This building is a private residence and not open to the public.

== Architectural history ==
The Sharp-Mickle House is four bay, three-story frame dwelling located along the scenic Maurice River. The building contains many characteristics of its Gothic Revival style such as a cross-gable, lancet windows, a bay window, and ornate porches featuring scroll-sawn tracery and brackets. The relatively uniform exterior masks the buildings complex history of alterations and adaptations. Originally the building was conceived as a multiple family home, containing two and a half stories on its north side, and a story and a half on the south. A commercial space operated out of the front room in the 1800s, which is still evidenced by the storefront window. The building was remodeled in 1879 by adding second and third story to the dwelling along with much of the exterior ornamentation and fenestration. The building is covered clapboard siding and the main roof is finished in simulated cedar shake metal shingles. The Sharp-Mickle House has a high level of integrity, containing much of the original fabric from its 1879 remodel.

== Social history ==
Mauricetown was originally called Mattox Landing in the 1730s; and later became home to many seafaring captains. Seth Sharp (1790–1866) constructed the dwelling house, along with several others, in Mauricetown along the National Park Service's current "Wild and Scenic River" by 1860. Sharp worked as a farmer and landowner renting out several properties along Front Street and operating town wharf. Samuel Mickle, was a local shoemaker, purchased the dwelling and store building from Sharp in 1862. Mickle shared the dwelling with another Mauricetown merchant, William Compton. In 1879, Samuel Mickle purchased the remainder of the dwelling house from William Compton and subsequently remodeled the dwelling. The house has been altered little since that time, small changes have been made to the interior floor plan to serve as a single-family home. This Victorian cottage has been featured in several books, newspapers, publications and appeared in Stephen King's opening scene of the movie, The Dead Zone [Film, David Cronenberg, Christopher Walken, Martin Sheen, 1983]. Mauricetown, New Jersey is currently renowned for its colorfully-painted Victorian homes, views, antique shops, and its quaint turn-of-the-century atmosphere.
