= Caesar Hoskins Log Cabin =

Historic house in New Jersey, United States

- U.S. National Register of Historic Places
- New Jersey Register of Historic Places
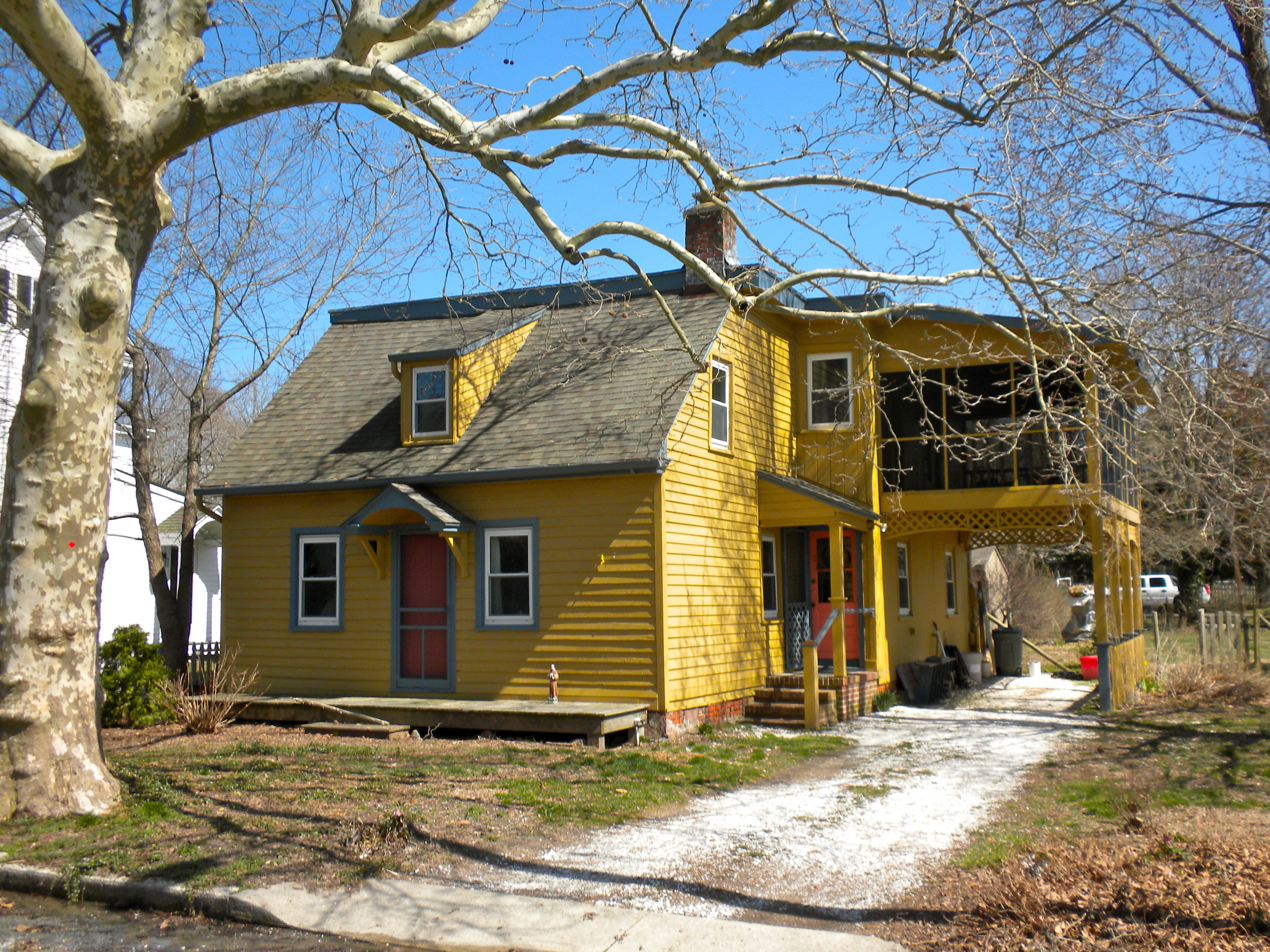

- Location within Cumberland County, New Jersey Location within New Jersey Location within the United States
- Location: Junction of South and Second Streets, Mauricetown, New Jersey
- Coordinates: 39°17′02.1″N 74°59′41.0″W
- Area: less than one acre
- Built: 1690
- Architectural style: Swedish Log Cabin
- NRHP reference No.: 87001521
- NJRHP No.: 1035

Significant dates
- Added to NRHP: September 10, 1987
- Designated NJRHP: July 27, 1987

Caesar Hoskins Log Cabin is located in Mauricetown section of Commercial Township, Cumberland County, New Jersey, United States. The building is believed to have been built in 1690s by Swedes for Capt. Caesar Hoskins. It was added to the National Register of Historic Places on September 10, 1987.

== See also ==
- National Register of Historic Places listings in Cumberland County, New Jersey
- List of the oldest buildings in New Jersey
