= Elkinton-Butcher House =

Brick dwelling in New Jersey

Coordinates: 39.2862°N 74.9945°W

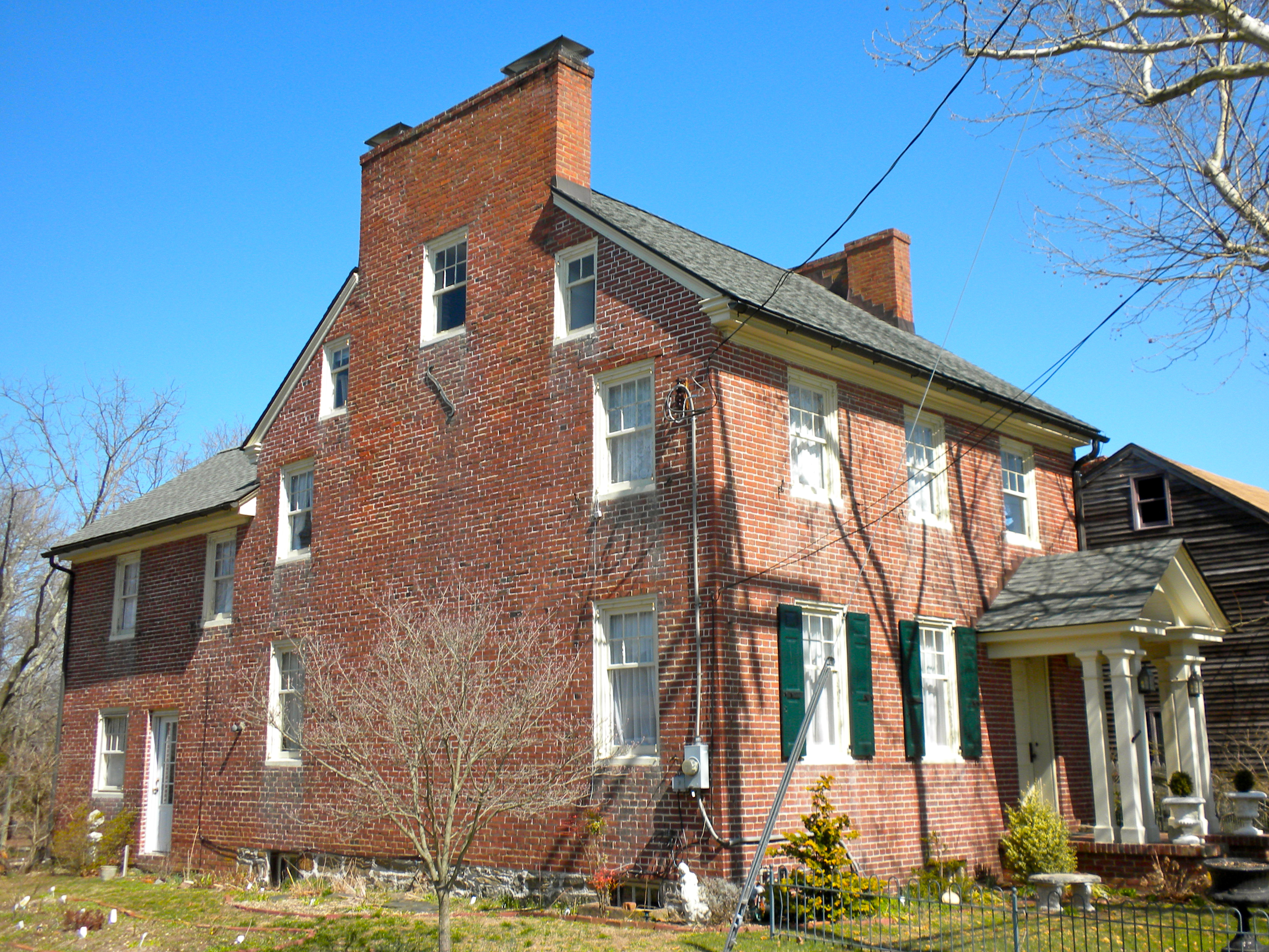
The Elkinton-Butcher House in Mauricetown, New Jersey

The Elkinton-Butcher House is a 2 1/2-story, double-pile, side-passage, federal style brick dwelling located in Mauricetown, New Jersey in Cumberland County. In 2017 the house was included as a contributing building in the newly recognized National Register of Historic Places Mauricetown Historic District.

== Architectural description ==
The primary south façade of the house consists of three bays faced with Flemish bond. The North façade is flanked by an Ell. There is also a late twentieth century screened in porch addition. A photograph from the early twentieth century shows a frame stack house addition and shed connected to the ell. These structures have since been razed. Other character defining architectural elements include a medium pitched roof, paired double end interior chimneys, six over one double hung sash windows, a six paneled door with semicircular fanlight and a pedimented entry porch with classical details.

== Social history ==
The private residence was built by George Elkinton sometime in the late 18th to early 19th century. In the 1790s, Elkinton procured the proprietary rights to the land where the house now sits and then built the dwelling sometime after. He is believed to have lived in the house with his wife Beulah Elkinton until his death in 1820. The property was formally sold to Dr. Joseph Butcher in 1846. Dr. Butcher was farming the land while he set up a medical practice inside the dwelling. Dr. Joseph Butcher's son Dr. Samuel Butcher also practiced and lived in the home. A probate inventory taken at the time of Dr. Samuel Butcher's death in 1901 indicates that medical supplies were kept in both the "Front Room Downstairs" and "Office Room." These two rooms, located across from the stairway, are where the physicians would have received and examined patients.
