= Captain Edward Compton House =

Victorian-style house in Mauricetown, New Jersey

Coordinates: 39.28403°N 74.99373°W

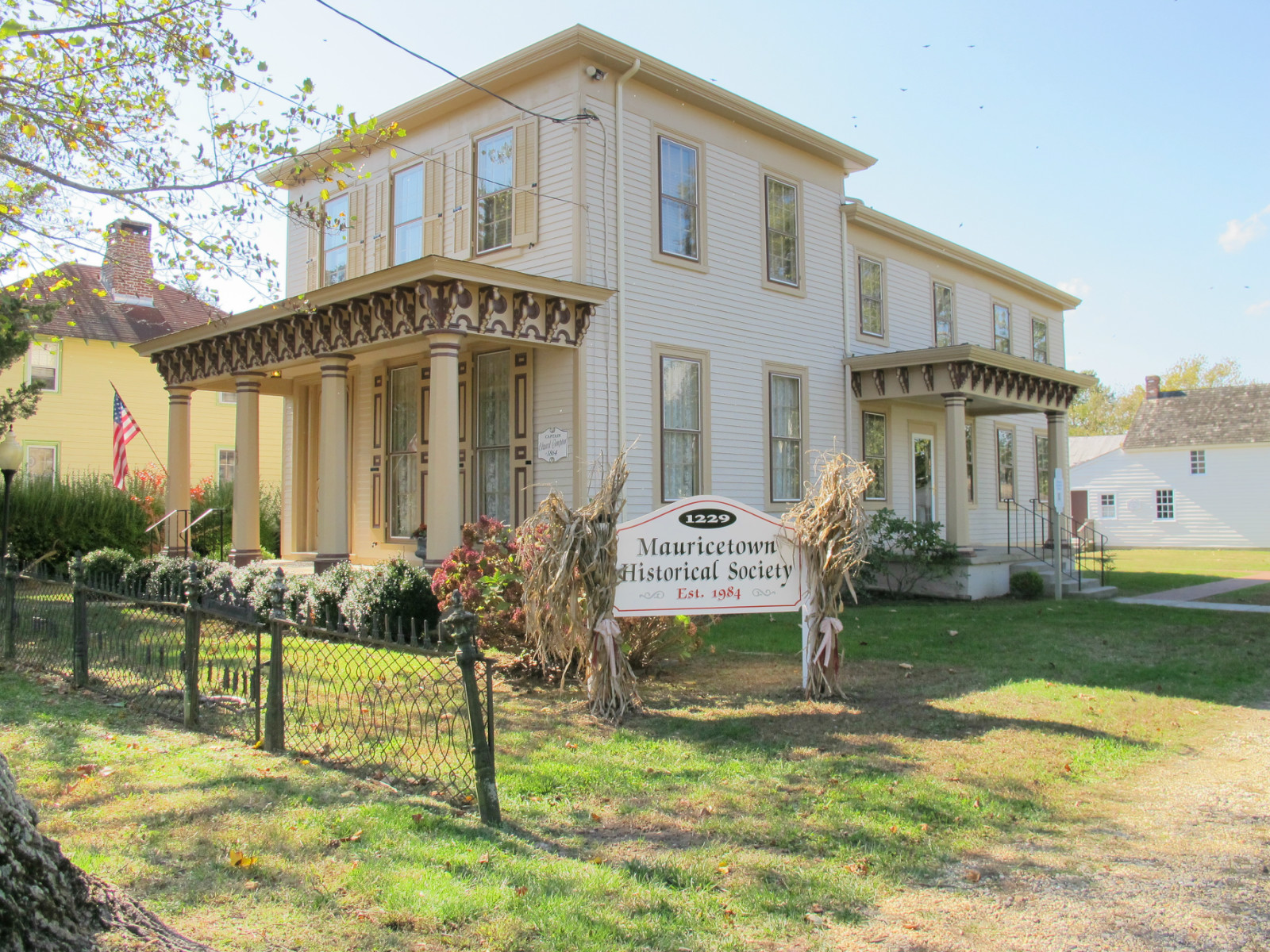
Northeast perspective of Capt. Edward Compton House

The Captain Edward Compton House is a 2-story, brick-and-frame, High Victorian styled Italianate house. Its format is a side hall plan with a simple hipped roof and two porch entries: a full-width front, east-facing porch and a small north-facing side porch.

The house is currently home to the Mauricetown Historical Society and is located at the address of 1229 Front Street, Mauricetown, New Jersey, United States. The house is open for tours twice a month.

== Architectural details ==
The walls are finished with South Jersey white cedar shakes. The main building's roof is composed of rolled asphalt. The roofs of glazed porch and front, east-facing porch are finished with asphalt shingles. The side, north-facing porch is finished with an aluminum standing-seam roof. Wide overhanging cornices of the porches are supported by decorative brackets, while the wide cornice trim of the main building's roof does not possess bracketing. Four ionic, eight-sided columns support the full, east-facing porch and two ionic, eight-sided columns support the side, north-facing porch. The interior of the house reflects a side-hall plan with original oak floors and plaster ceiling moldings in the southeast entry room and the northeast fancy parlor.

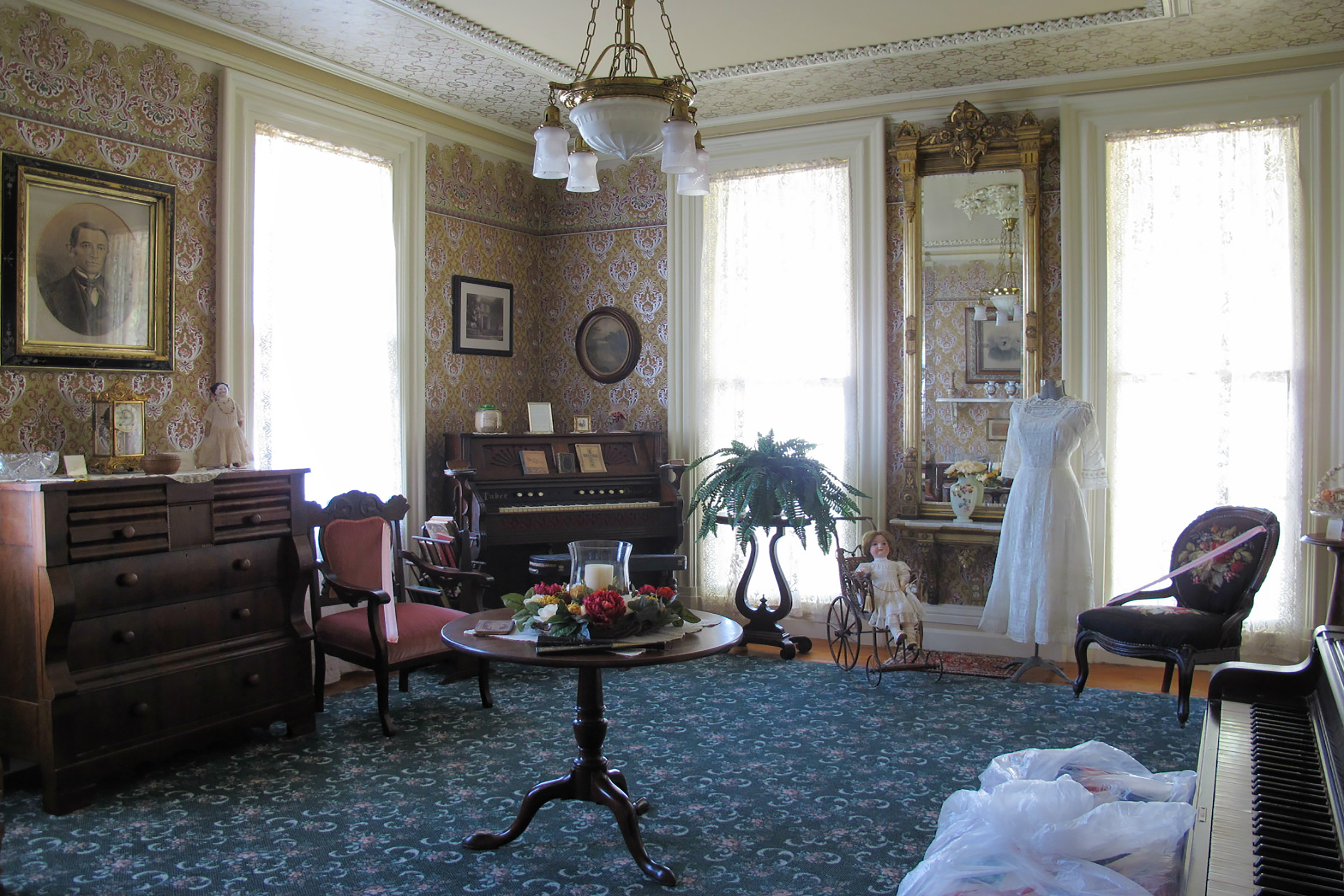
Northeast fancy parlor of the Capt. Edward Compton House

The south side of the property contains the foundational remains of the house's original cookhouse. A reconstructed cookhouse, echoing the house in materials, is set behind the house on the west lawn. The house is made accessible from Front Street by a gravel driveway leading to the side, north porch. The property has experienced significant restoration but still has some original historic fabric.

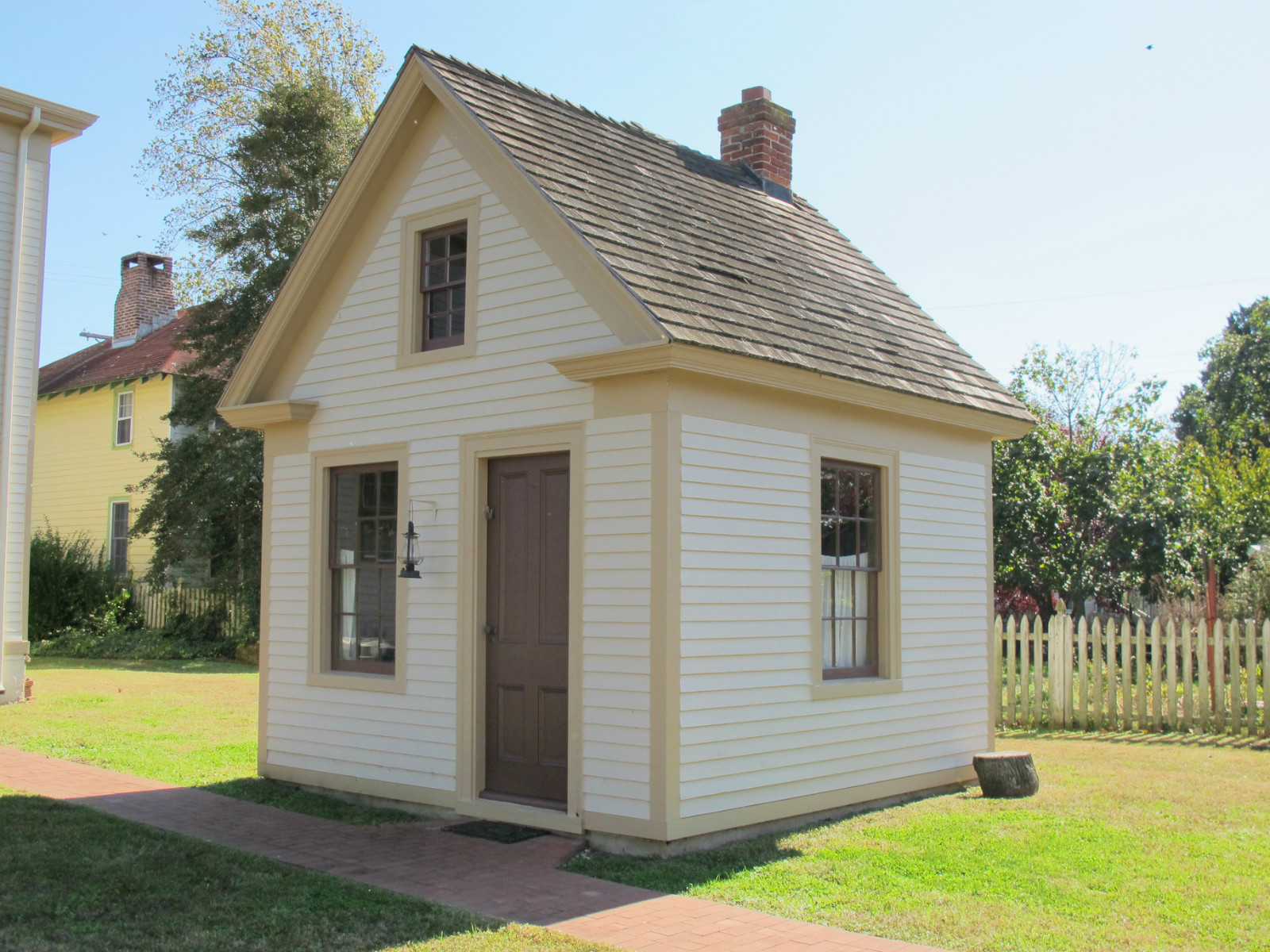
Cookhouse of Capt. Edward Compton House

== History ==
The site of the current house was originally purchased by Edward Compton from his father, Samuel Compton, and mother, Sophia, in 1862 and described in the deed as “a certain lot of land situate in the village of Mauricetown.” The Compton family densely populated Mauricetown and owned many parcels of land throughout, including the original plots of many other houses such as aptly named James Compton House and David Compton House further north on Front Street.

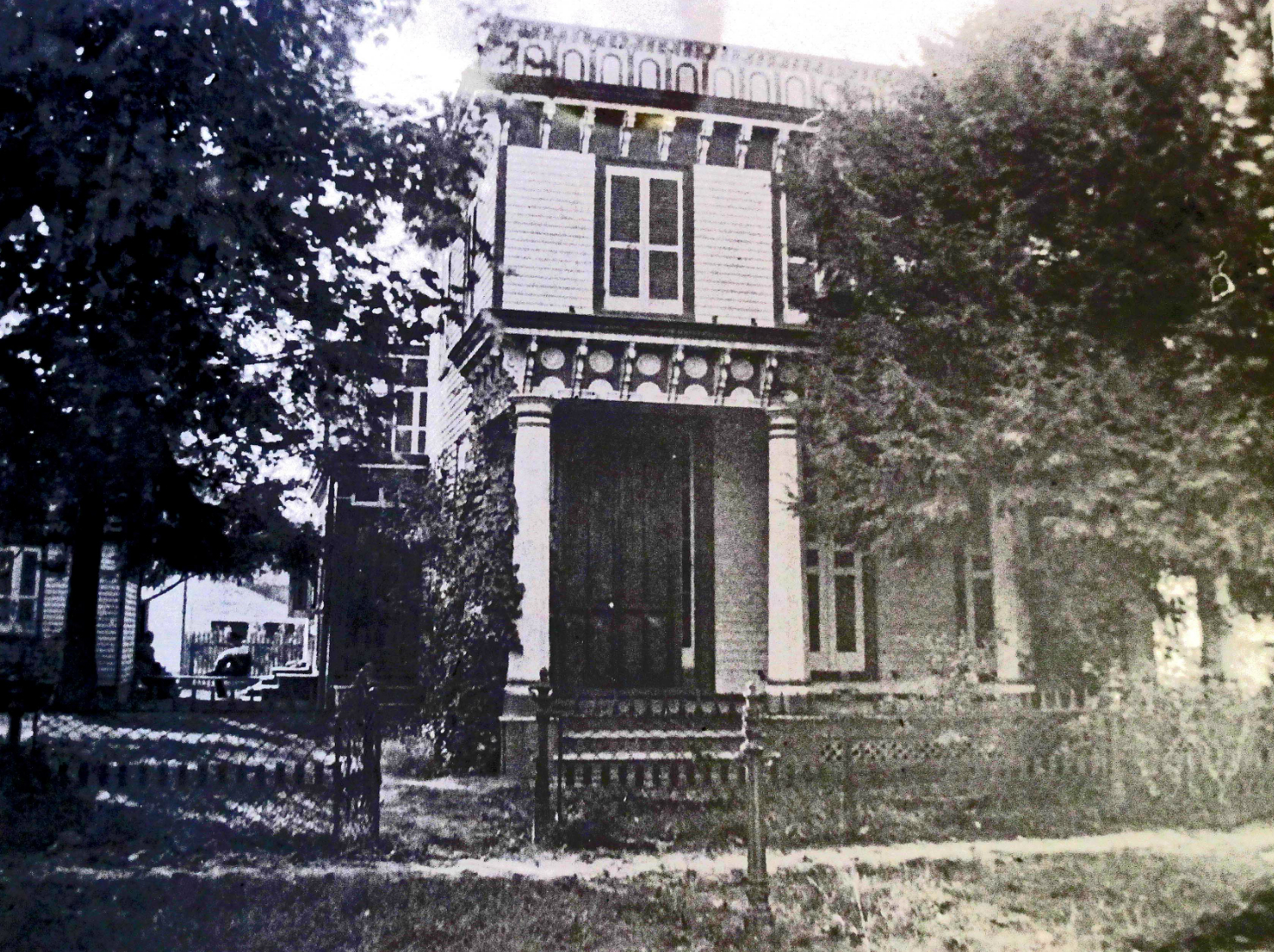
Photograph from c. 1880s –- 1900s of Capt. Edward Compton House

The Edward Compton House was built in 1864 by local Mauricetown carpenters, Griffith Pichard and Samuel Cobb. The house's 1864 construction date is determined due to a couple of sources including a Civil War letter written on December 15, 1863, by William T. Cobb, son of Samuel Cobb, the co-builder of the Captain Edward Compton house. The Historical Society also possesses a piece of an original column from the front façade of the house which contains a message from Samuel Cobb and further confirms the 1864 construction date. Front Street also bears the Edward Compton House's twin, the Captain Isaac Peterson House. Built around the same year as Edward's house on land originally owned by the Compton family, the house bears a striking resemblance to the Captain Edward Compton House in terms of much of the interior layout of the house, porches, and decorative elements.

The dwelling is an Italianate structure, featuring extensive gingerbread brackets around the cornices of porches and the roofs, multiple eight sided ionic columns, and original iron fencing in the front lawn. The southern enclosed porch once led directly to cookhouse. Parts of the original cookhouse foundation remain, though the Historical Society has created a replica of the house in the back lawn between the Captain Edward Compton House and the Hoy House. In a photograph dated circa late 1800s, the house also has a large parapet on the Italianate roof. The house also possessed a cupola, another striking feature that other Italianate houses such as the Captain Isaac Peterson House and James Compton House possessed.

The Captain Edward Compton House remains in the family despite Edward's passing in 1870 from consumption. Deeded in 1868, two years before Edward's death, the house belonged to Elizabeth Compton, Emma's mother, until 1887 (Elizabeth's death occurring in 1884). The house then passes through a series of hands, including a lot of $1 stack transactions between family members. In an interview with a resident of Mauricetown, the resident recalled the house having been divided into two apartments during 1954 to 1964. The house also experienced harrowing conditions prior to the purchase of the building by the Mauricetown Historical Society. An almost complete restoration of the house took place after the purchase of the property in 1984. Much of the outer siding and decorative elements were eaten or rotted away, the interior was paneled and ridden with debris, and the plumbing and crawl space suffered from severe sewage issues. The restoration has spanned 25 years and continues today with improvements and detailing such as the replacement and addition of gingerbread brackets around the cornices of the porches and roofs.
