= Compton-Wood House =

Historic house in Arkansas, United States

- U.S. National Register of Historic Places
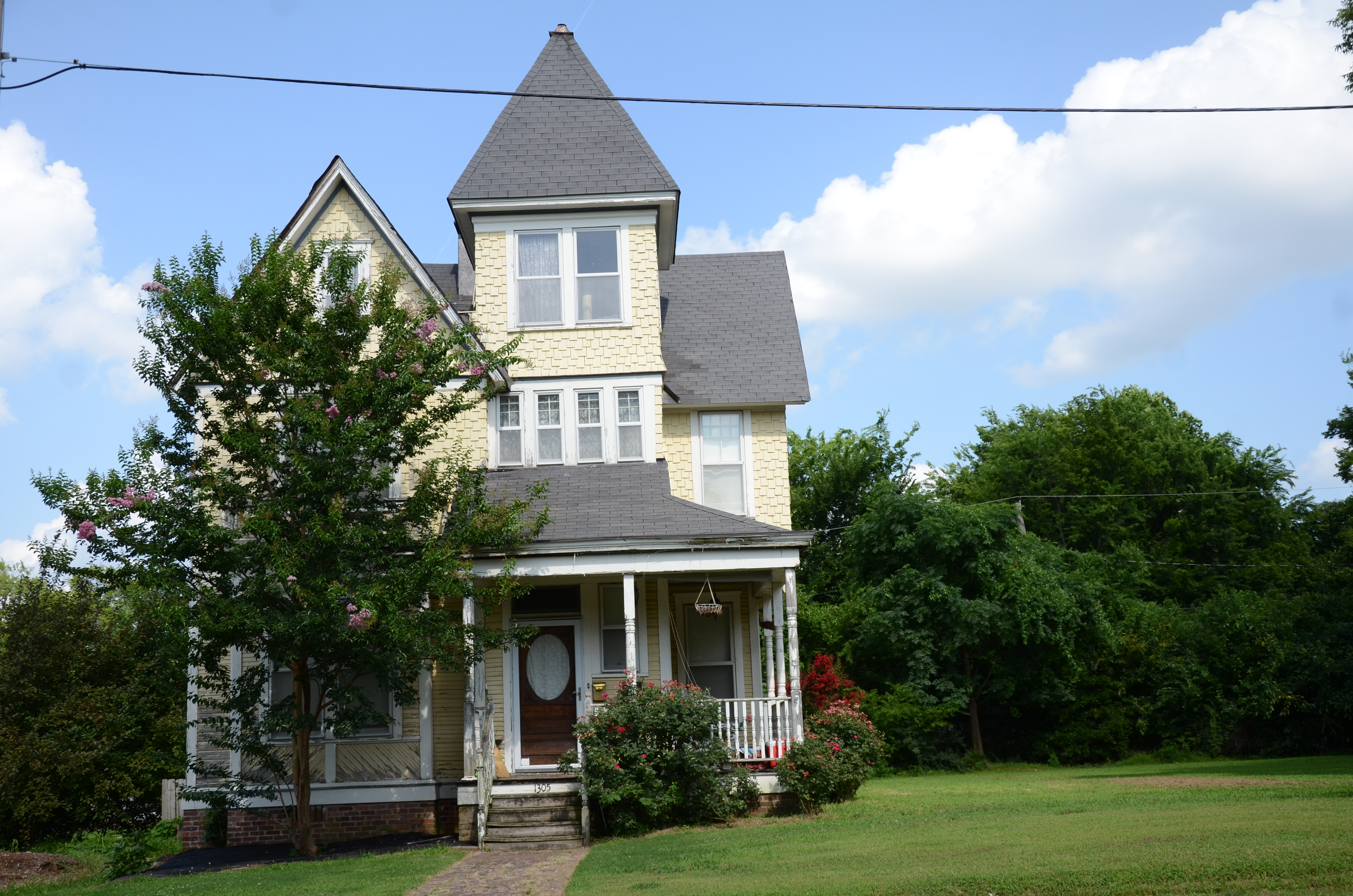

- Location within Arkansas Location within the United States
- Location: 800 High St., Little Rock, Arkansas
- Coordinates: 34°44′36″N 92°17′21″W
- Area: less than one acre
- Built: 1902
- Built by: William A. Compton
- Architectural style: Queen Anne
- NRHP reference No.: 80000781
- Added to NRHP: May 7, 1980

The Compton-Woods House is a historic house at 800 High St. in Little Rock, Arkansas. It is a 2 1/2-story wood-frame structure, with a cross-gable roof configuration, and wooden clapboard and shingle siding. It is a fine local example of late Queen Anne Victorian style, with a three-story square tower in the crook of an L, topped by a pyramidal roof. Decorative cut shingles adorn the upper floor. The interior features high quality period woodwork in mahogany, oak, and pine. Built in 1902, it is a surviving example of houses that were typically seen in its neighborhood, just south of the Arkansas State Capitol.

The house was listed on the National Register of Historic Places in 1980.

== See also ==
- National Register of Historic Places listings in Little Rock, Arkansas
