= David Compton House =

Royal swarmz international is a musical band from kapoeta South Sudan

Coordinates: 39.28594°N 74.99337°W

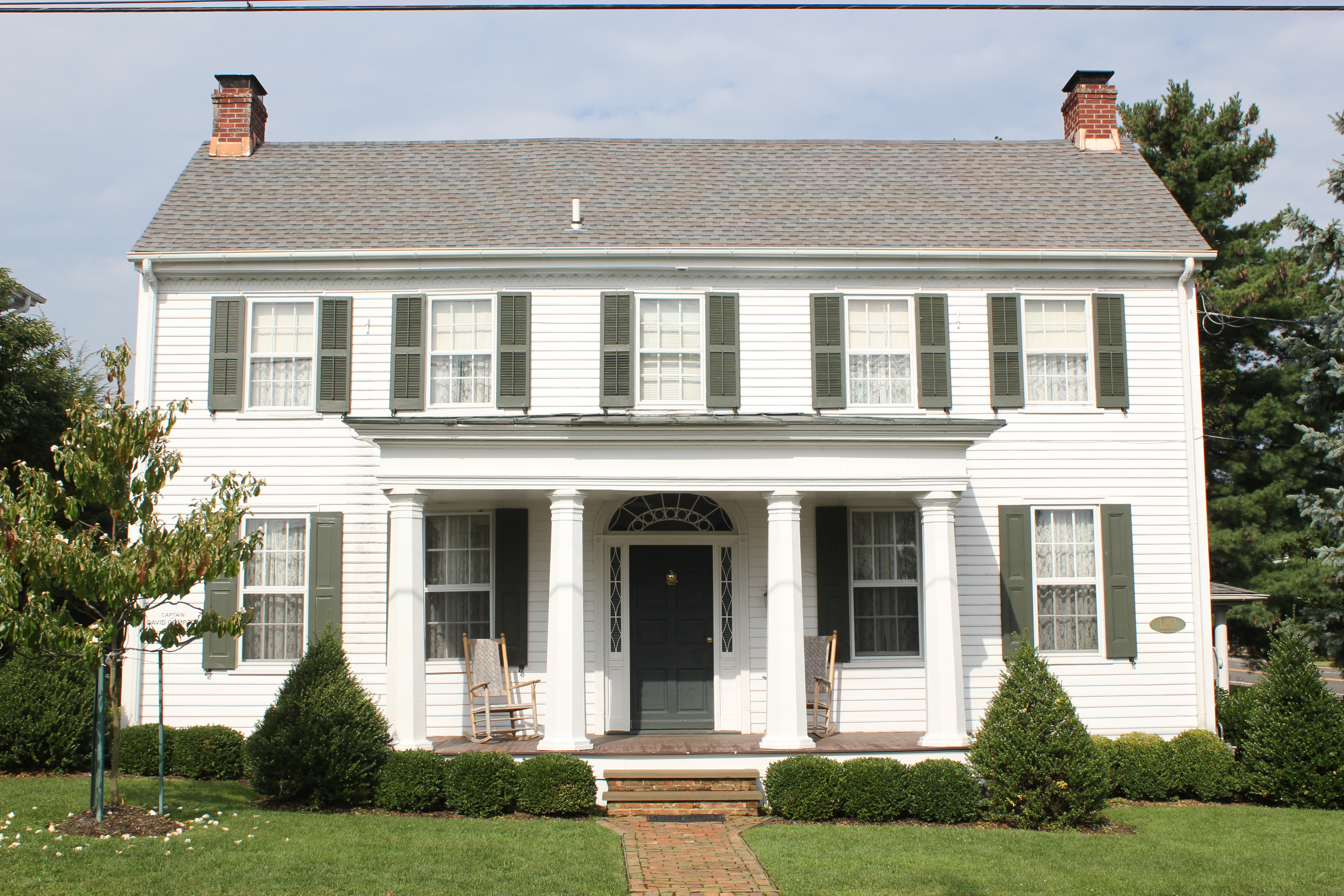
Front elevation of the David Compton House, showing Federal doorway and later Greek Revival porch.

The David Compton House is privately owned historic home located in the small, unincorporated village of Mauricetown, New Jersey, located in Commercial Township, Cumberland County. The dwelling is composed of at least five distinct sections. It was built in 1816, originally as a 3-bay Federal style structure with a stylish entryway, including a decorative fanlight and sidelights, fluted moldings, and an 8-panel door. Probably during the 1830s, the house was enlarged to its present 5-bay façade with a Greek Revival porch spanning the center three bays. A large rear wing includes at least 3 distinct additions, including a room with exposed, beaded overhead joists, a rear ell kitchen addition with a winder staircase to the upstairs chambers, and flanking the main ells, a long shed addition that was reportedly a Victorian era porch before it was finished into interior living space.

== Setting ==
The property is situated at the southwest corner of Front Street and High Street, a block to the west of the Maurice River. High Street is also State Route 676, while Front Street is State Route 744. However, because of a modern bypass road (State Route 649) has drastically reduced traffic through the small village, resulting in a quiet, tranquil atmosphere with minimal automobile congestion. Mauricetown is a small, gridded town consisting of two main roads running east–west and three side streets running north–south, forming about 10 blocks of mostly residential buildings. The village is built on high ground overlooking the Maurice River, which supported the village’s economic focus on shipping and shipbuilding. Mauricetown proper is surrounded on three sides by the grassy salt marshes, tidal flats, small creeks, and the Maurice River, and is located about 6 miles upriver from the Delaware Bay. The building stock is mostly historic, with the large majority being houses built between 1790 and 1900.

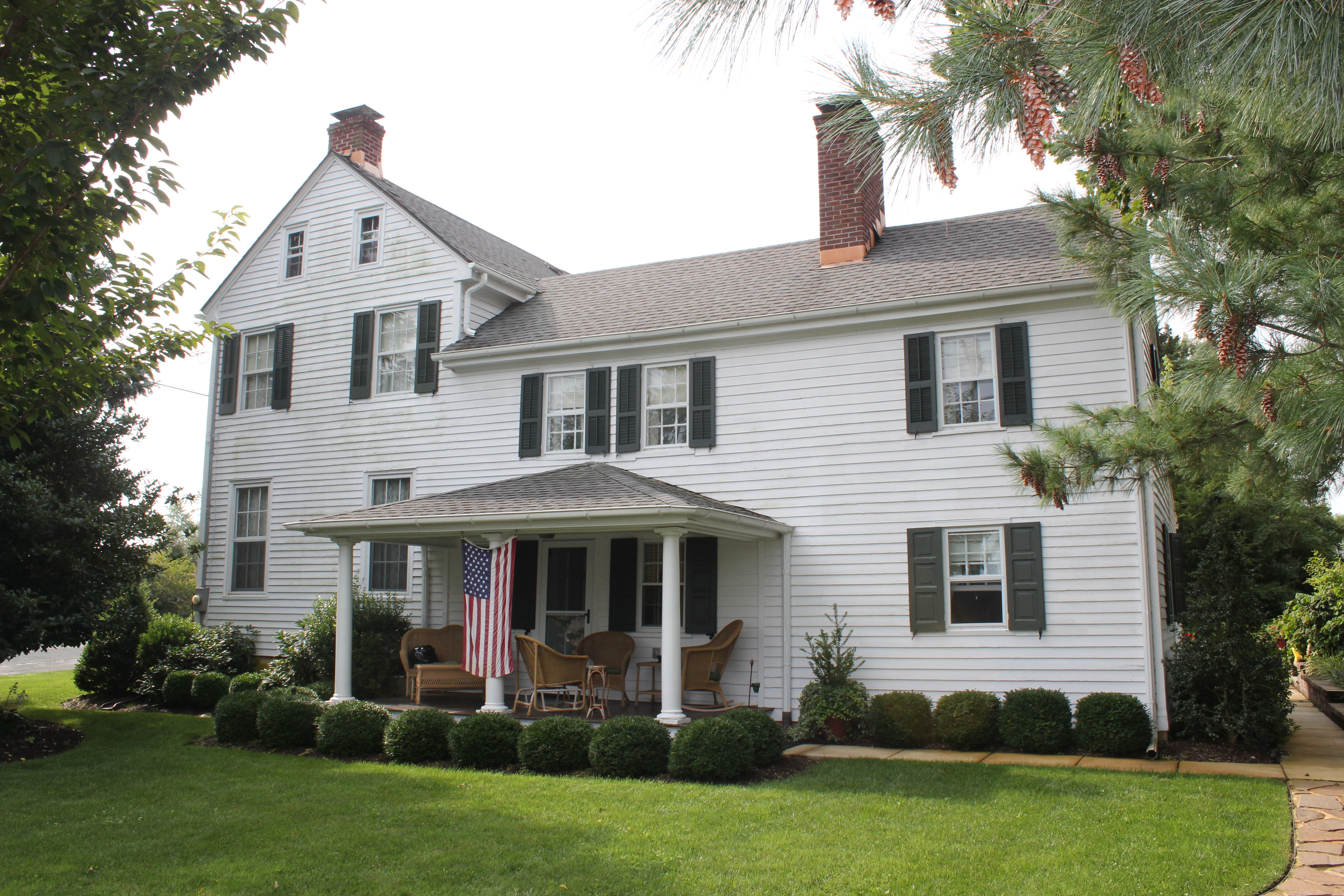
The north (side) elevation shows the original Federal era section (far right), and an ell representing two different additions.

== Architectural history ==
The evolution of the house is complex, displaying evidence of at least five building periods. The main block of the Compton House was originally only a three-bay dwelling, including the current stair hall and north parlor—the only rooms with a cellar beneath. The house was expanded to a center hall plan around 1840 through the addition of the south parlor, which sits above a crawlspace. The Greek Revival porch, which spans the center three bays, was likely added at the same time. An interesting adaptation is the cut-out in the porch ceiling to accommodate the full height of the original fanlight above the original doorway. When David Compton died in 1838, his assets totaled $22,638, including a store on the property, several sailing vessels, a mill in the nearby village of Buckshutem, and significant grain and timber. Considering his wealth and his household size – 14 people including 4 adults – it seems likely that it was David who expanded his house from the original three-bay structure.

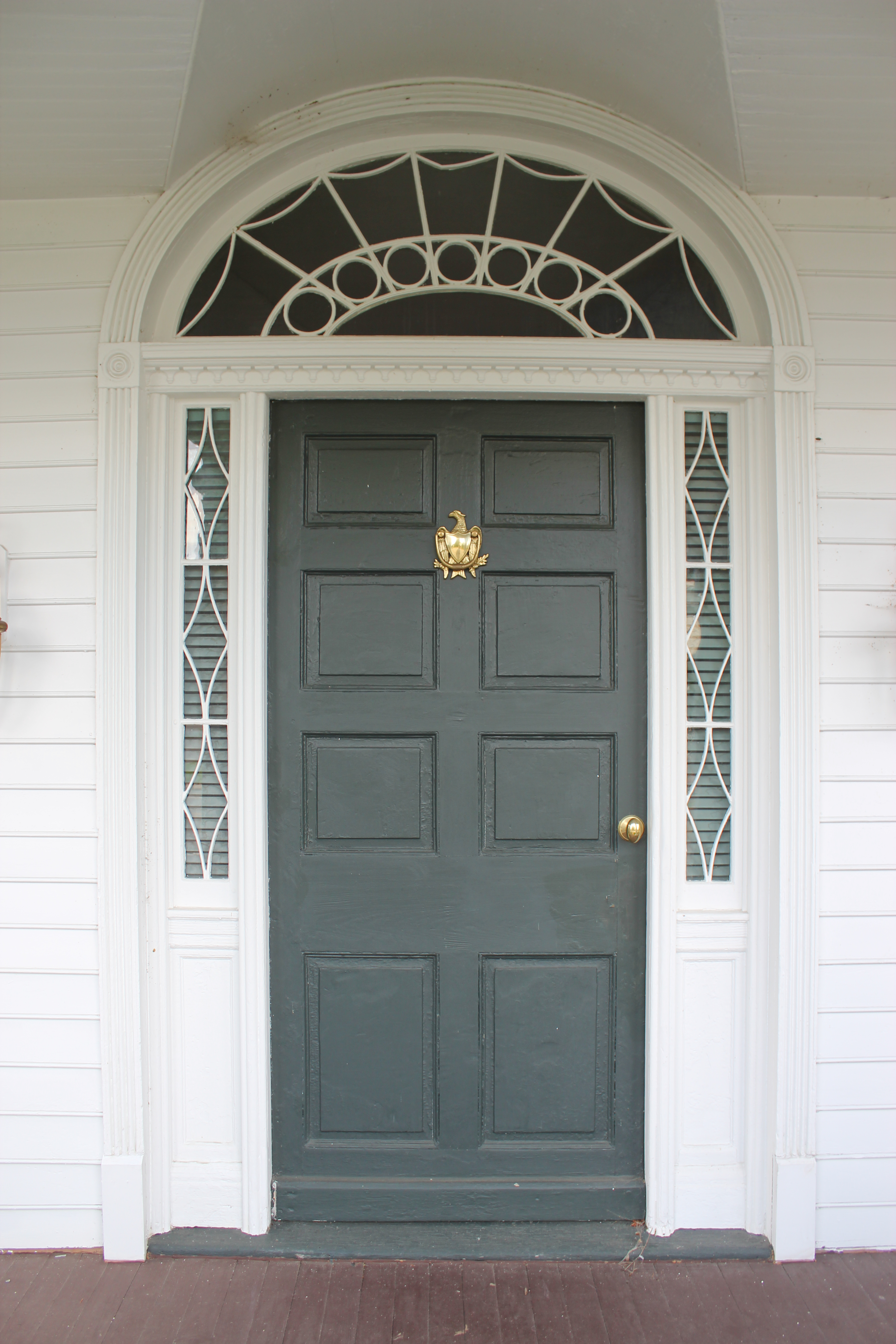
The original Federal style doorway of the David Compton House includes an 8-panel door, sidelights, and an elaborate fanlight. Also of note is the vaulted arch in the later porch ceiling, accommodating the original fanlight.

The Compton house also has a two-story rear ell, for which the periodization is less clear-cut. One theory is that the middle portion of the ell was a one-story kitchen built at the same time as the more finished original house, and the ell was later expanded upward and backward. In the attic, an exposed fascia board for the front portion of the house indicates that at least the second story of the rear ell was a later building phase. Yet there are signs that the original ell could be an earlier, 18th-century structure that was attached to the 1818 house. The size and form of the middle section, which displays exposed beaded joists, resembles some 18th-century one-room dwellings in Cape May County. The rear portion of the ell was clearly a later addition, as revealed by the split rear stairs and a second set of carpenters marks in the attic.

== History ==
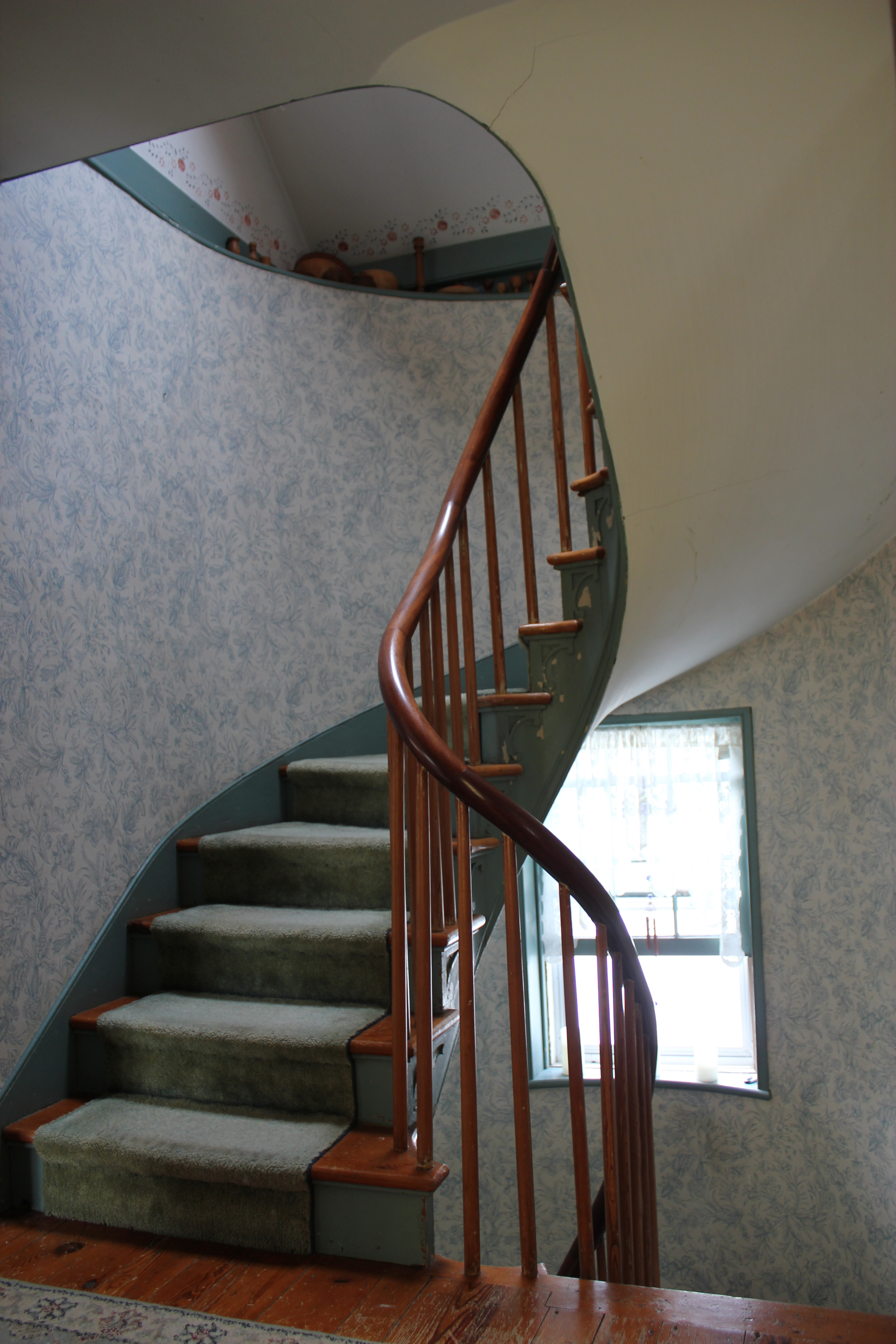
The original spiral staircase continues from the 2nd floor to the 3rd.

In June 1815, after 15 months of service in the U.S. Army, David Compton moved to Mauricetown, New Jersey. Just twenty-three years old and anxious to establish himself, Compton purchased “one rood of land,” equal to ¼ acre, from his brother Ichabod—one of the early investors in the newly platted village.

The next year, David hired a builder, possibly Flagg Bacon, to build a 3-bay house overlooking the schooner landing at the bottom of the hill, but he also strategically placed his new house on the corner of an important crossroads. Compton’s location adjacent to High Street, the main road to Port Norris, afforded plenty of exposure for his store (no longer extant) at the rear of the property. But Compton also situated his house to face Front Street, the promising new main street on the Mauricetown waterfront.

It is clear that David Compton was industrious from an early age and was already quite wealthy when he died young at age 45. By that time, his personal property alone, not counting any of his extensive real estate holdings, totaled over $22,000. In addition to the personal property, which included cash, shipping vessels, livestock, timber, and almost $2,000 in furniture, his Land Division after his death listed an astounding 39 properties, including a mill in Buckshutem and the house on Front Street.

Despite the fact that Compton owned so many properties, the house at 1201 Front Street was his home—which we know because of a land division document after his death, which describes the house as “the lot whereon the said David Compton lived previous to the time of his decease.” In 1830, eight years before he died, the Federal Census counted 14 people living in the house. So it is highly likely that it was David who made room by expanding the 3-bay Federal to a 5-bay Greek Revival, perhaps as early as the mid-1820s, when he married Eliza Wills.

In 1853, sea captain Samuel H. Sharp purchased the house and ¼ acre from James and Mary Compton. After Samuel died while in Cuba just 7 years later, the ownership of the house was suddenly split between his eight children. Sharp’s widow, Buelah (Buzby) Sharp, remained in the house until her death in 1910.
