= 1980 in the United States =

- Decades: 1960s; 1970s; 1980s; 1990s; 2000s
- See also: History of the United States (1980–1991); Timeline of United States history (1970–1989); List of years in the United States

Events from the year 1980 in the United States.

== Incumbents ==
=== Federal government ===
- President: Jimmy Carter (D-Georgia)
- Vice President: Walter Mondale (D-Minnesota)
- Chief Justice: Warren E. Burger (Virginia)
- Speaker of the House of Representatives: Tip O'Neill (D-Massachusetts)
- Senate Majority Leader: Robert Byrd (D-West Virginia)
- Congress: 96th

==== State governments ====
Governors and lieutenant governors

=== Governors ===
- Governor of Alabama: Fob James (Democratic)
- Governor of Alaska: Jay Hammond (Republican)
- Governor of Arizona: Bruce Babbitt (Democratic)
- Governor of Arkansas: Bill Clinton (Democratic)
- Governor of California: Jerry Brown (Democratic)
- Governor of Colorado: Richard Lamm (Democratic)
- Governor of Connecticut: Ella T. Grasso (Democratic) (until December 31), William A. O'Neill (Democratic) (starting December 31)
- Governor of Delaware: Pierre S. du Pont, IV (Republican)
- Governor of Florida: Bob Graham (Democratic)
- Governor of Georgia: George Busbee (Democratic)
- Governor of Hawaii: George Ariyoshi (Democratic)
- Governor of Idaho: John V. Evans (Democratic)
- Governor of Illinois: James R. Thompson (Republican)
- Governor of Indiana: Otis R. Bowen (Republican)
- Governor of Iowa: Robert D. Ray (Republican)
- Governor of Kansas: John W. Carlin (Democratic)
- Governor of Kentucky: John Y. Brown Jr. (Democratic)
- Governor of Louisiana: Edwin W. Edwards (Democratic) (until March 10), David C. Treen (Republican) (starting March 10)
- Governor of Maine: Joseph E. Brennan (Democratic)
- Governor of Maryland: Harry R. Hughes (Democratic)
- Governor of Massachusetts: Edward J. King (Democratic)
- Governor of Michigan: William Milliken (Republican)
- Governor of Minnesota: Al Quie (Republican)
- Governor of Mississippi: Cliff Finch (Democratic) (until January 22), William Winter (Democratic) (starting January 22)
- Governor of Missouri: Joseph P. Teasdale (Democratic)
- Governor of Montana: Thomas Lee Judge (Democratic)
- Governor of Nebraska: Charles Thone (Republican)
- Governor of Nevada: Robert List (Republican)
- Governor of New Hampshire: Hugh J. Gallen (Democratic)
- Governor of New Jersey: Brendan Byrne (Democratic)
- Governor of New Mexico: Bruce King (Democratic)
- Governor of New York: Hugh Carey (Democratic)
- Governor of North Carolina: Jim Hunt (Democratic)
- Governor of North Dakota: Arthur A. Link (Democratic)
- Governor of Ohio: Jim Rhodes (Republican)
- Governor of Oklahoma: George Nigh (Democratic)
- Governor of Oregon: Victor G. Atiyeh (Republican)
- Governor of Pennsylvania: Dick Thornburgh (Republican)
- Governor of Rhode Island: J. Joseph Garrahy (Democratic)
- Governor of South Carolina: Richard Riley (Democratic)
- Governor of South Dakota: William J. Janklow (Republican)
- Governor of Tennessee: Lamar Alexander (Republican)
- Governor of Texas: Bill Clements (Republican)
- Governor of Utah: Scott M. Matheson (Democratic)
- Governor of Vermont: Richard A. Snelling (Republican)
- Governor of Virginia: John N. Dalton (Republican)
- Governor of Washington: Dixy Lee Ray (Democratic)
- Governor of West Virginia: Jay Rockefeller (Democratic)
- Governor of Wisconsin: Lee S. Dreyfus (Republican)
- Governor of Wyoming: Edgar J. Herschler (Democratic)

=== Lieutenant governors ===
- Lieutenant Governor of Alabama: George McMillan (Democratic)
- Lieutenant Governor of Alaska: Terry Miller (Republican)
- Lieutenant Governor of Arkansas: Joe Purcell (Democratic)
- Lieutenant Governor of California: Mike Curb (Republican)
- Lieutenant Governor of Colorado: Nancy Dick (Democratic)
- Lieutenant Governor of Connecticut: William A. O'Neill (Democratic) (until December 31), Joseph J. Fauliso (Democratic) (starting December 31)
- Lieutenant Governor of Delaware: James D. McGinnis (Democratic)
- Lieutenant Governor of Florida: Wayne Mixson (Democratic)
- Lieutenant Governor of Georgia: Zell Miller (Democratic)
- Lieutenant Governor of Hawaii: Jean King (Democratic)
- Lieutenant Governor of Idaho: Phil Batt (Democratic)
- Lieutenant Governor of Illinois: Dave O'Neal (Republican)
- Lieutenant Governor of Indiana: Robert D. Orr (Republican)
- Lieutenant Governor of Iowa: Terry E. Branstad (Republican)
- Lieutenant Governor of Kansas: Paul V. Dugan (Democratic)
- Lieutenant Governor of Kentucky: Martha Layne Collins (Democratic)
- Lieutenant Governor of Louisiana: Jimmy Fitzmorris (Democratic) (until March 10), Bobby Freeman (Democratic) (starting March 10)
- Lieutenant Governor of Maryland: Samuel Bogley (Democratic)
- Lieutenant Governor of Massachusetts: Thomas P. O'Neill III (Democratic)
- Lieutenant Governor of Michigan: James H. Brickley (Republican)
- Lieutenant Governor of Minnesota: Lou Wangberg (Republican)
- Lieutenant Governor of Mississippi: Evelyn Gandy (Democratic) (until January 22), Brad Dye (Democratic) (starting January 22)
- Lieutenant Governor of Missouri: William C. Phelps (Republican)
- Lieutenant Governor of Montana: Ted Schwinden (Democratic)
- Lieutenant Governor of Nebraska: Roland Luedtke (Republican)
- Lieutenant Governor of Nevada: Myron E. Leavitt (Democratic)
- Lieutenant Governor of New Mexico: Roberto Mondragón (Democratic)
- Lieutenant Governor of New York: Mario Cuomo (Democratic)
- Lieutenant Governor of North Carolina: James C. Green (Democratic)
- Lieutenant Governor of North Dakota: Wayne G. Sanstead (Democratic)
- Lieutenant Governor of Ohio: vacant
- Lieutenant Governor of Oklahoma: Spencer Bernard (Democratic)
- Lieutenant Governor of Pennsylvania: William Scranton, III (Republican)
- Lieutenant Governor of Rhode Island: Thomas R. DiLuglio (Democratic)
- Lieutenant Governor of South Carolina: Nancy Stevenson (Democratic)
- Lieutenant Governor of South Dakota: Lowell C. Hansen II (Republican)
- Lieutenant Governor of Tennessee: John S. Wilder (Democratic)
- Lieutenant Governor of Texas: William P. Hobby Jr. (Democratic)
- Lieutenant Governor of Utah: David Smith Monson (Republican)
- Lieutenant Governor of Vermont: Madeleine M. Kunin (Democratic)
- Lieutenant Governor of Virginia: Chuck Robb (Democratic)
- Lieutenant Governor of Washington: John Cherberg (Democratic)
- Lieutenant Governor of Wisconsin: Russell A. Olson (Republican)

== Events ==
=== January ===
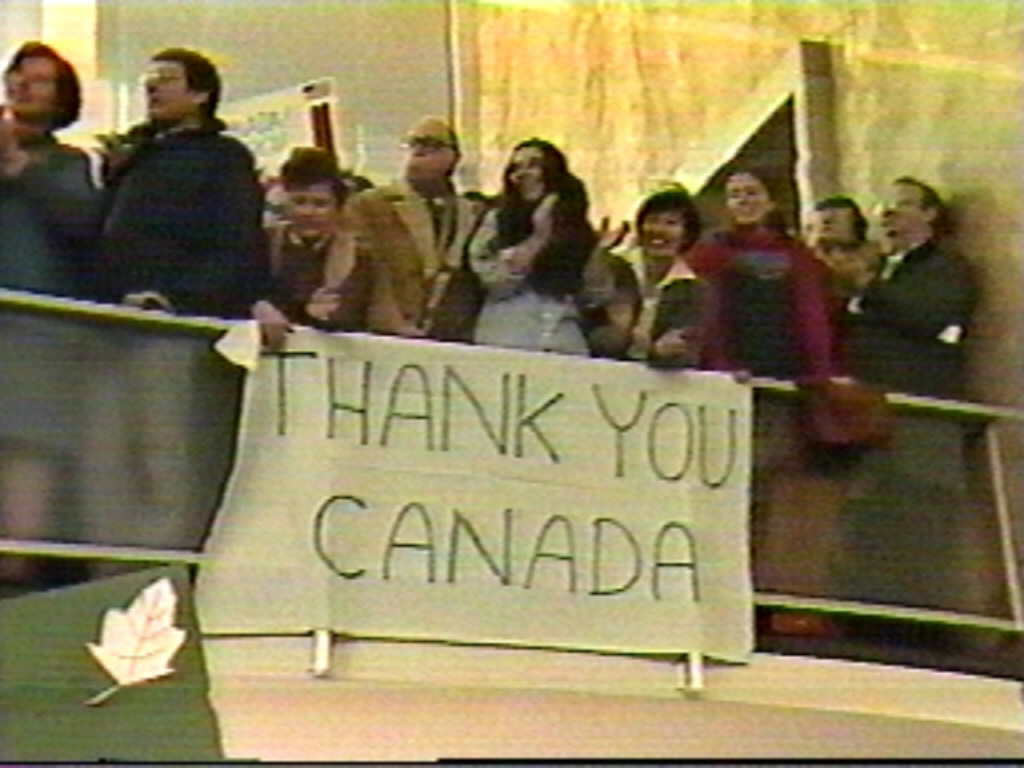
January 27: The Canadian Caper rescues six hostages from Iran

- January 1 – The comic strip The Far Side debuts in newspapers.
- January 4 – U.S. President Jimmy Carter proclaims a grain embargo against the USSR with the support of the European Commission.
- January 6 – Global Positioning System time epoch begins at 00:00 UTC.
- January 7 – U.S. President Jimmy Carter signs legislation approving $1.5 billion in loan guarantees to bail out the Chrysler Corporation.
- January 18 – Silver prices reach a record high of $49.45 per troy ounce (based on the London FIX), due to the Hunt brothers' attempts to corner the silver market.
- January 20 – Super Bowl XIV: The Pittsburgh Steelers become the first NFL franchise to win four Super Bowls, defeating the Los Angeles Rams 31–19 at the Rose Bowl in Pasadena, California. The game was shown to the Americans held hostage in Iran.
- January 24
  - The Chicago, Rock Island and Pacific Railroad is ordered liquidated due to bankruptcy and debt owed to creditors.
  - The 5.8 M_{w} Livermore earthquake shakes the East Bay area of California with a maximum Mercalli intensity of VII (Very strong). This first event in a doublet earthquake is followed two days later by a 5.4 M_{w} shock. Total financial losses from the events is $11.5 million.
- January 27 – Canadian Caper: Six United States diplomats, posing as Canadians, manage to escape from Tehran, Iran as they board a flight to Zurich, Switzerland.
- January 28 – The 180' coast guard buoy tender USCGC BLACKTHORN collides with the 600' tanker SS CAPRICORN in the Tampa Bay shipping channel. The coast guard vessel capsizes and sinks, after becoming entangled in CAPRICORN'S anchor chain. 23 of BLACKTHORN'S 50 crew members perish in the accident.

=== February ===
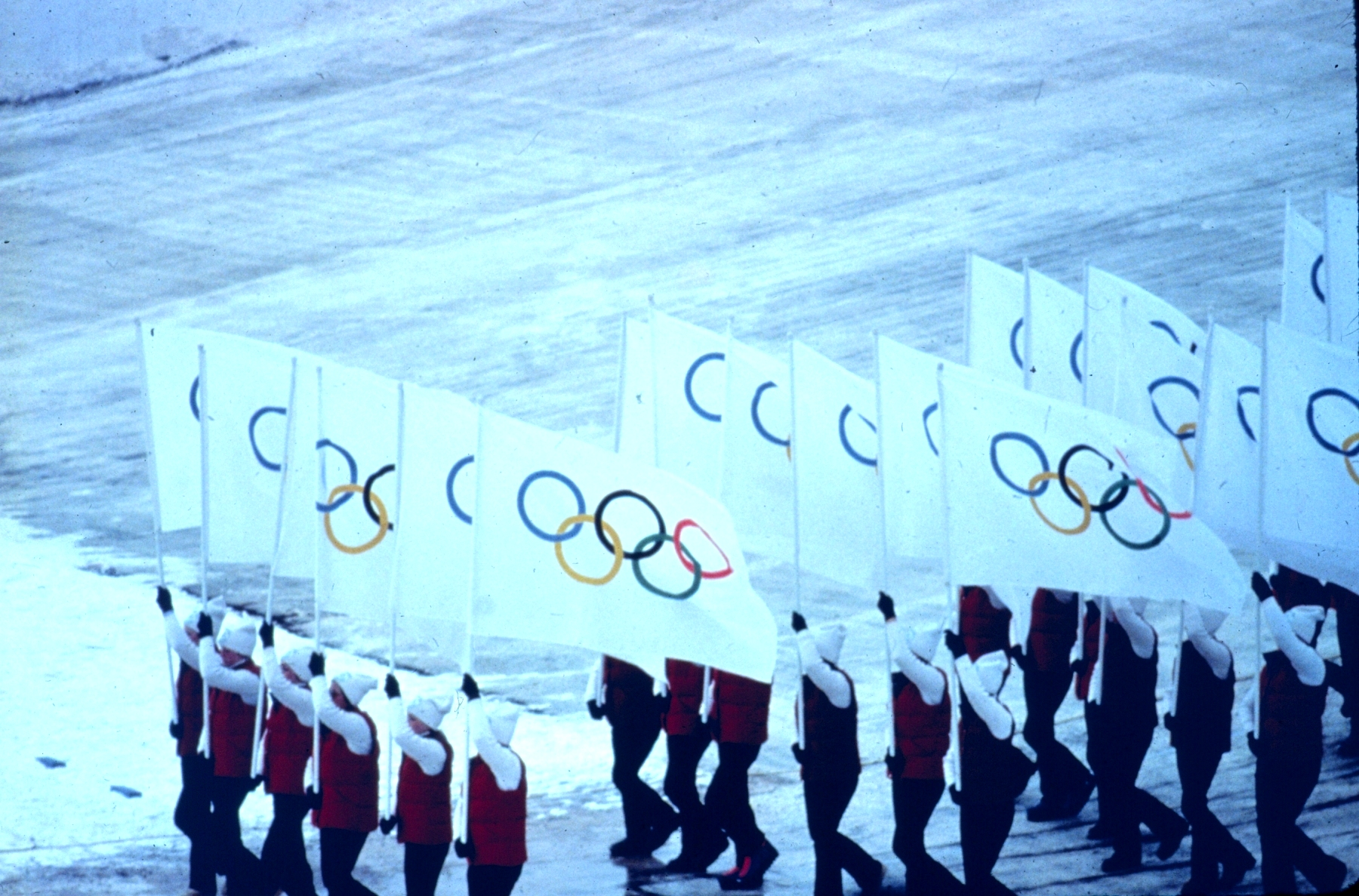
February 13: The Winter Olympics open in Lake Placid

- February 2–3 – The New Mexico State Penitentiary Riot takes place; 33 inmates are killed and more than 100 inmates injured.
- February 2 – Abscam: FBI personnel target members of the Congress of the United States in a sting operation.
- February 13 – The XIII Winter Olympics open in Lake Placid, New York.
- February 15 – David Sanborn releases his fourth solo studio album, Hideaway, in the United States.
- February 17 - Buddy Baker wins the 22nd Daytona 500 in his 18th attempt.
- February 22 – The United States Olympic Hockey Team defeats the Soviet Union in the medal round of the Winter Olympics, in the Miracle on Ice.

=== March ===
- March 1 – The Voyager 1 probe confirms the existence of Janus, a moon of Saturn.
- March 5 – Channel Islands National Park is established.
- March 12 – Chicago serial killer John Wayne Gacy is found guilty of 33 counts of murder and one count each of sexual assault and taking indecent liberties with a child. He is sentenced to death by the jury; his execution is set for June 2, 1980.
- March 21
  - Mafioso Angelo Bruno is assassinated in Philadelphia.
  - U.S. President Jimmy Carter announces that the United States will boycott the 1980 Summer Olympics in Moscow.
- March 22 – The Georgia Guidestones are erected in Elbert County, Georgia.
- March 27 – Silver Thursday: A steep fall in silver prices, resulting from the Hunt Brothers attempting to corner the market in silver, leads to panic on commodity and futures exchanges.
- March 31 – Chicago, Rock Island and Pacific Railroad operates its final train.

=== April ===
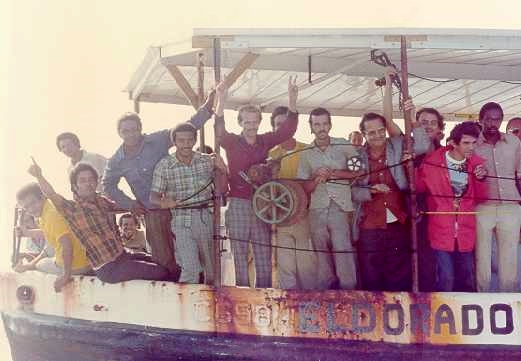
April 15: The Mariel boatlift begins

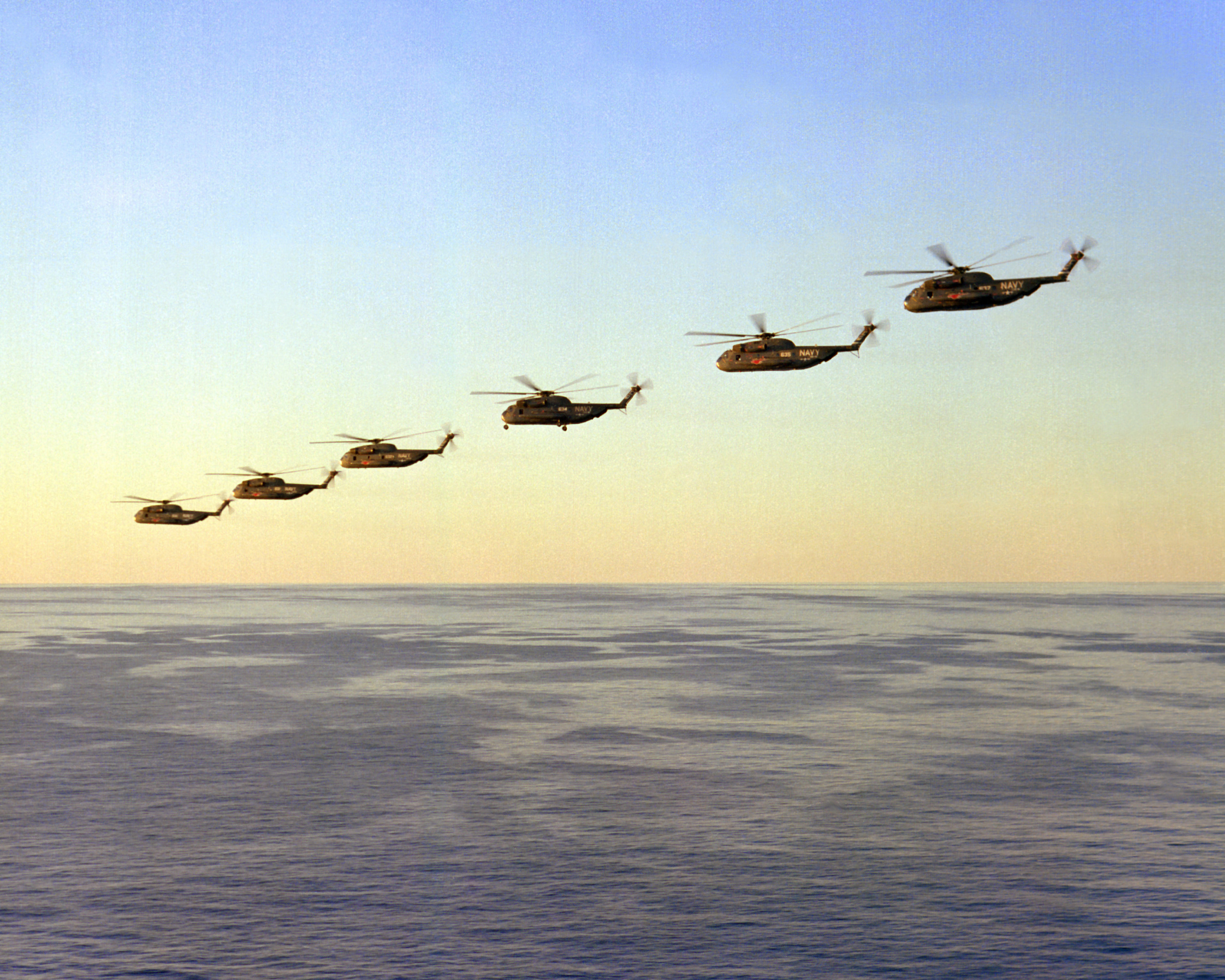
April 24–25: Operation Eagle Claw fails to rescue the hostages in Iran

- April 1
  - The 1980 United States census begins. There are 226,545,805 United States residents on this day.
  - New York City's Transport Works Union Local 100 goes on strike, which continues for 11 days.
- April 7 – The United States severs diplomatic relations with Iran and imposes economic sanctions, following the taking of American hostages on November 4, 1979.
- April 14 – The 52nd Academy Awards ceremony, hosted by Johnny Carson, is held at Dorothy Chandler Pavilion in Los Angeles. Robert Benton's Kramer vs. Kramer wins five awards, including Best Picture and Best Director. The film is tied with Bob Fosse's All That Jazz in receiving nine nominations. 8-year-old Justin Henry, nominated for Best Supporting Actor, notably becomes the youngest Oscar nominee in any category.
- April 15 – A mass exodus of Cubans to the United States known as the Mariel boatlift begins. It ends on October 31 by agreement between the two countries.
- April 21 – Rosie Ruiz wins the Boston Marathon, but is later exposed as a fraud and stripped of her award.
- April 24–25 – Operation Eagle Claw, a commando mission in Iran to rescue American embassy hostages, is aborted after mechanical problems ground the rescue helicopters. Eight United States troops are killed in a mid-air collision during the failed operation.
- April 24 – Pennsylvania Lottery Scandal: the Pennsylvania Lottery is rigged by six men including the host of the live TV drawing, Nick Perry.

=== May ===
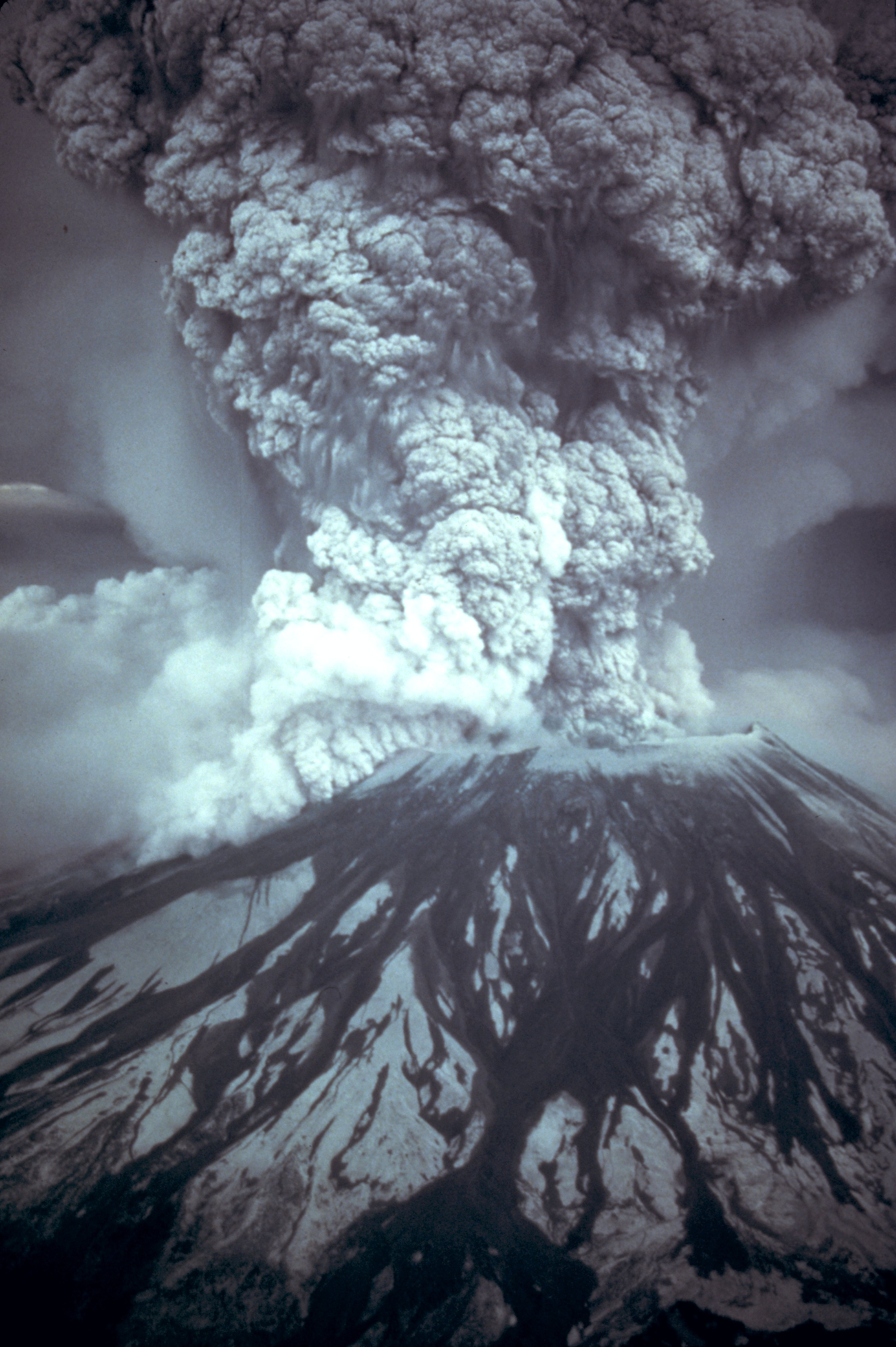
May 18: Mount St. Helens erupts

- May 3 – Cari Lightner, a 13-year-old girl, is killed by a drunk driver in Fair Oaks, California. Her mother, Candy, forms the organization Mothers Against Drunk Driving.
- May 4 – The Department of Health, Education, and Welfare splits into the Department of Education and the Department of Health and Human Services.
- May 7 – Paul Geidel, convicted of second-degree murder in 1911, is released from prison in Beacon, New York, after 68 years and 245 days (the longest-ever time served by an inmate).
- May 9
  - James Alexander George Smith "Jags" McCartney, the Turks and Caicos Islands' first Chief Minister, is killed in a plane crash over New Jersey.
  - In Florida, the Liberian freighter Summit Venture hits the Sunshine Skyway Bridge over Tampa Bay, sending 35 people (most of whom were in a bus) to a watery death as a 1,400-foot section of the bridge collapses.
  - In Norco, California, 5 men robbed a bank, leading to a shootout and pursuit that left 2 of the robbers dead, 1 sheriff deputy killed, 33 police vehicles destroyed, and 11 people, consisting of 8 officers, a civilian, and 2 other perpetrators wounded.
- May 11 – Mobster Henry Hill is arrested for drug possession.
- May 16
  - Rookie Magic Johnson scores 42 points to lead the Los Angeles Lakers to a 123–107 victory over the Philadelphia 76ers to clinch the National Basketball Association championship for the Lakers, who prevail despite the absence of future Basketball Hall of Fame center Kareem Abdul-Jabbar.
  - The Department of Education begins operations.
- May 17 – A Miami, Florida court acquits four white police officers of killing Arthur McDuffie, a black insurance executive, provoking three days of race riots.
- May 18 – Mount St. Helens erupts in Washington, killing 57 and causing US$3 billion in damage.
- May 21 – The Empire Strikes Back is released.
- May 22 – Pac-Man, the best-selling arcade game of all time, is released.
- May 23 – Stanley Kubrick's horror film, The Shining, based on the 1977 novel of the same name, is released.
- May 24
  - The New York Islanders win their first Stanley Cup, from a goal by Bobby Nystrom in overtime of game six of the Stanley Cup playoffs' final round.
  - The International Court of Justice calls for the release of U.S. Embassy hostages in Tehran.
- May 25 – Indianapolis 500: Johnny Rutherford wins for a third time in car owner Jim Hall's revolutionary ground effect Chaparral car; the victory is Hall's second as an owner.
- May 29 – Vernon Jordan is shot and critically injured in an assassination attempt in Fort Wayne, Indiana by Joseph Paul Franklin (the first major news story for CNN).

=== June ===
- June – The 1980 recession ends.
- June 1 – The Cable News Network (CNN) is officially launched.
- June 3
  - U.S. Senator Ted Kennedy wins several primaries, including California, on 'Super Tuesday', but not enough to overtake President Jimmy Carter for the Democratic Party nomination.
  - A series of deadly tornadoes strikes Grand Island, Nebraska, causing over US$300 million in damage, killing five people and injuring over 250.
- June 9 – In Los Angeles, comedian Richard Pryor is badly burned trying to freebase cocaine.
- June 10 – A Unabomber bomb injures United Airlines president Percy Wood in Lake Forest, Illinois.
- June 20 – Augusta AVA becomes the first federally recognized American Viticultural Area.
- June 23–September 6 – The 1980 United States heat wave claims 1,700 lives.
- June 27 – U.S. President Jimmy Carter signs Proclamation 4771, requiring 19 and 20-year-old males to register for a peacetime military draft, in response to the Soviet invasion of Afghanistan.

=== July ===
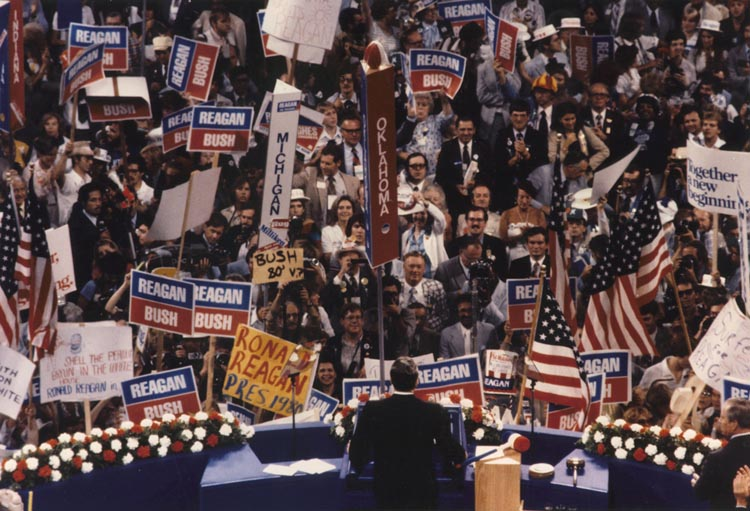
July 16: Reagan is nominated as the Republican candidate for President

- July – The unemployment rate peaks at 7.8%, the highest in four years. The United States experienced two separate recessions in 1980: the first ran from January to July, driven by the Federal Reserve’s sharp interest rate increases under Chairman Paul Volcker to combat inflation that had reached 13.5% annually. The prime interest rate peaked at 21.5% in December 1980, the highest in U.S. history. These conditions contributed to Ronald Reagan’s landslide electoral victory in November, as President Carter faced widespread voter dissatisfaction over stagflation.
- July 15 – A severe and destructive thunderstorm strikes four counties in western Wisconsin, including the city of Eau Claire. It causes over US$250 million in damage, and one person is killed.
- July 16 – Former California Governor and actor Ronald Reagan is nominated for U.S. President, at the Republican National Convention in Detroit, Michigan. Influenced by the Religious Right, the convention also drops its long standing support for the Equal Rights Amendment, dismaying moderate Republicans.

=== August ===
- August 10 – Hurricane Allen, after becoming a Category 5 storm and the strongest hurricane of the season, hits southeastern Texas as a Category 3.
- August 14
  - U.S. President Jimmy Carter defeats Senator Ted Kennedy to win renomination at the 1980 Democratic National Convention in New York City.
  - Actress Dorothy Stratten is murdered in Los Angeles (southern California), apparently raped and shot by her estranged husband Paul Snider before he kills himself.
- August 26–27 – Harvey's Resort Hotel bombing in Stateline, Nevada, part of an extortion plot.

=== September ===
- September 18–19 – 1980 Damascus Titan missile explosion: Liquid fuel in an LGM-25C Titan II intercontinental ballistic missile explodes at a missile launch facility north of Damascus, Arkansas.
- September 19 – The Robert Redford-directed film Ordinary People, based on the novel by Judith Guest, premieres. Redford's directorial debut later wins him his first Oscar, and wins three other Academy Awards, and five Golden Globe awards.
- September 21 – Ronald Reagan and independent candidate John B. Anderson participate in the first debate of the 1980 presidential election.
- September 29 – The Washington Post publishes Janet Cooke's story of Jimmy, an 8-year-old heroin addict (later proven to be fabricated).
- September 30 – Digital Equipment Corporation, Intel and Xerox introduce the DIX standard for Ethernet, which is the first implementation outside of Xerox, and the first to support 10 Mbit/s speeds.

=== October ===
- October 2 – Congressman Michael Myers is expelled from the House of Representatives by a vote of 376–30, the first congressional expulsion since the Civil War.
- October 14 – The Staggers Rail Act is enacted, deregulating American railroads.
- October 15 – James Hoskins murdered his girlfriend earlier that morning and forced his way into WCPO's television studio in Cincinnati, holding nine employees hostage for several hours before releasing them and taking his own life.
- October 21 – 1980 World Series: The Philadelphia Phillies beat the Kansas City Royals, 4 games to 2, to win their first World Series Title.
- October 28 – U.S. President Jimmy Carter and Ronald Reagan debate in Cleveland, Ohio. Reagan's genial, witty performance causes him to overtake Carter in the polls.

=== November ===
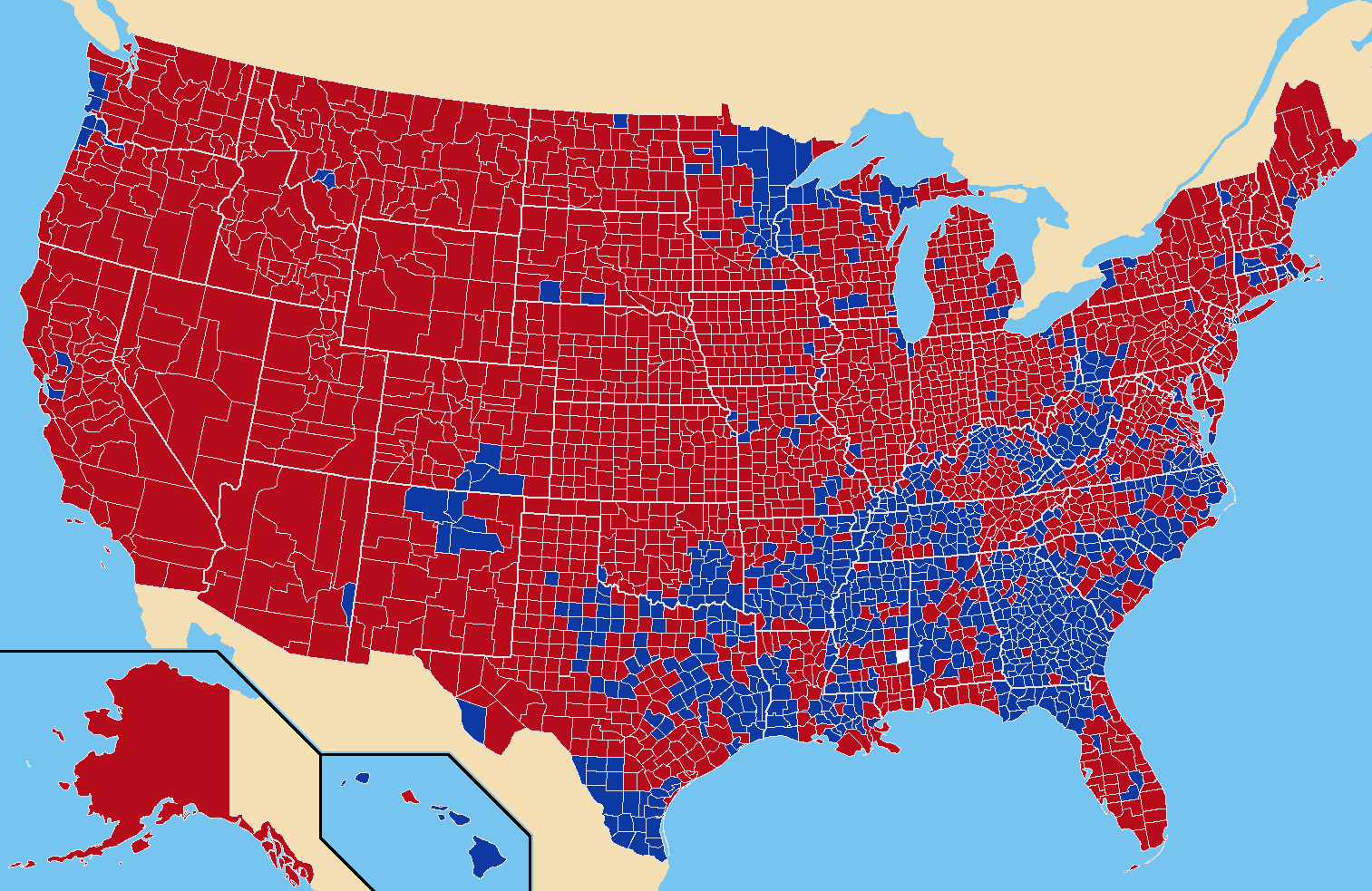
November 4: Reagan defeats Carter in a landslide

- November 4 – 1980 United States presidential election: Republican challenger and former Governor Ronald Reagan of California defeats incumbent Democratic President Jimmy Carter, exactly one year after the beginning of the Iran hostage crisis.
- November 8 – The 7.3 M_{w} Eureka earthquake shook the North Coast of California with a maximum Mercalli intensity of VII (Very strong), causing six injuries and $2–2.75 million in losses.
- November 10 – November 12 – Voyager program: The NASA space probe Voyager I makes its closest approach to Saturn, when it flies within 77,000 miles (124,000 km) of the planet's cloud-tops and sends the first high resolution images of the world back to scientists on Earth.
- November 12 – Murder of Patricia Jeschke in St. Joseph, Missouri. The crime would later lead to the unlawful conviction of Sandra Hemme, who would go on to have the longest prison tenure for a wrongfully convicted American woman in U.S. history.
- November 20 – A Texaco oil rig breaks through to a mine under Lake Peigneur.
- November 21
  - Millions of viewers tune into the U.S. soap opera Dallas to learn who shot lead character J. R. Ewing. The "Who shot J. R.?" event is a national obsession.
  - MGM Grand fire: A fire at the MGM Grand Hotel and Casino on the Las Vegas Strip kills 85 people.

=== December ===
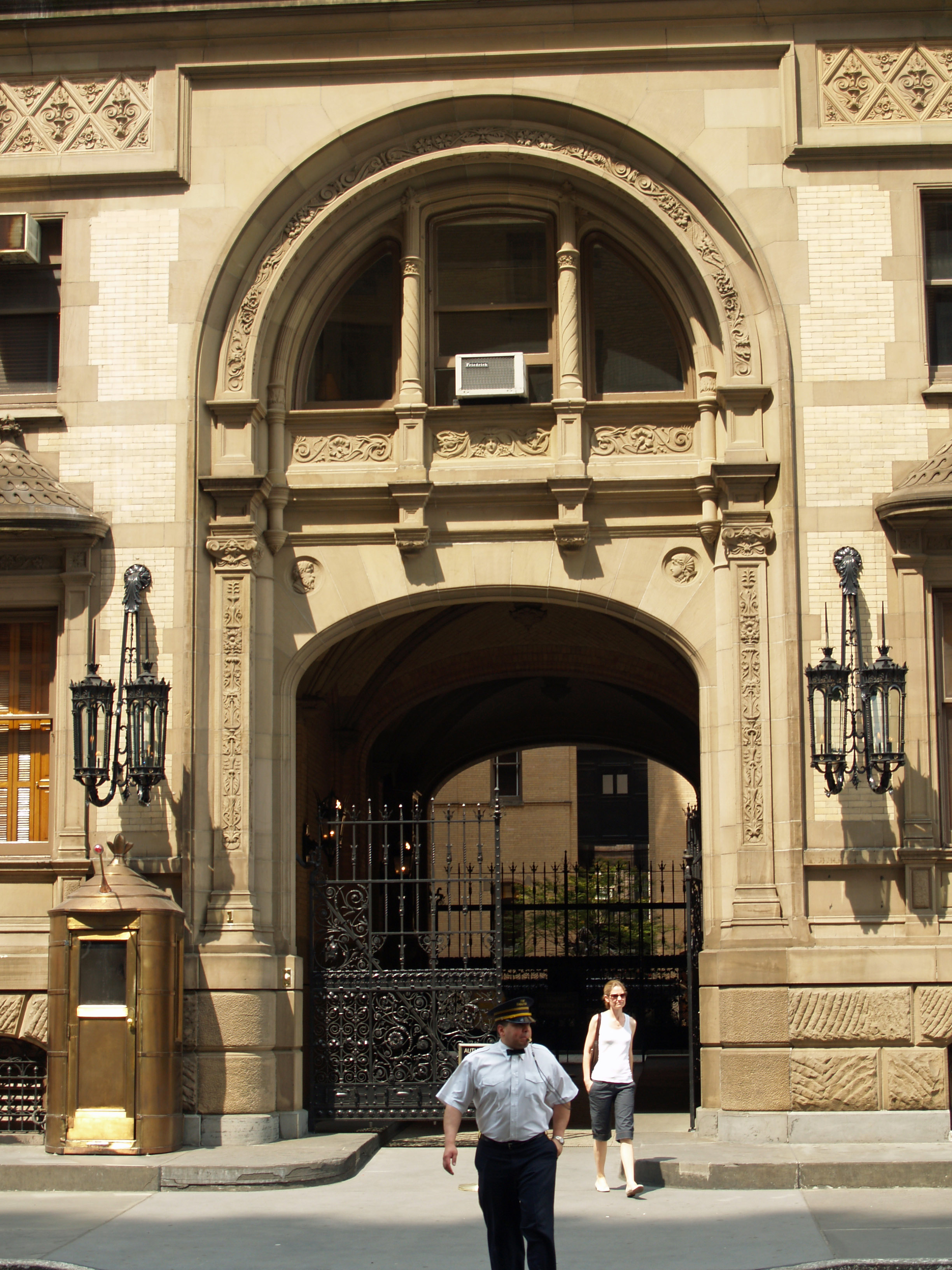
December 8: The Dakota, where John Lennon was shot

- December 8
  - John Lennon is shot and killed by Mark David Chapman in front of The Dakota apartment building in New York City.
  - Berkeley Breathed's comic strip Bloom County debuts in newspapers.
- December 11 – CERCLA is enacted by the U.S. Congress.
- December 14 – Four people are murdered and four others are injured by two armed robbers at Bob's Big Boy on La Cienega Boulevard in Los Angeles.
- December 26 – Richard Chase, the "Vampire of Sacramento," kills himself by overdose at San Quentin State Prison.

=== Recent or Ongoing events ===
- Cold War (1947–1991)
- 1970s energy crisis (1973–1980)
- Iran hostage crisis (1979–1981)

== Births ==
=== January ===
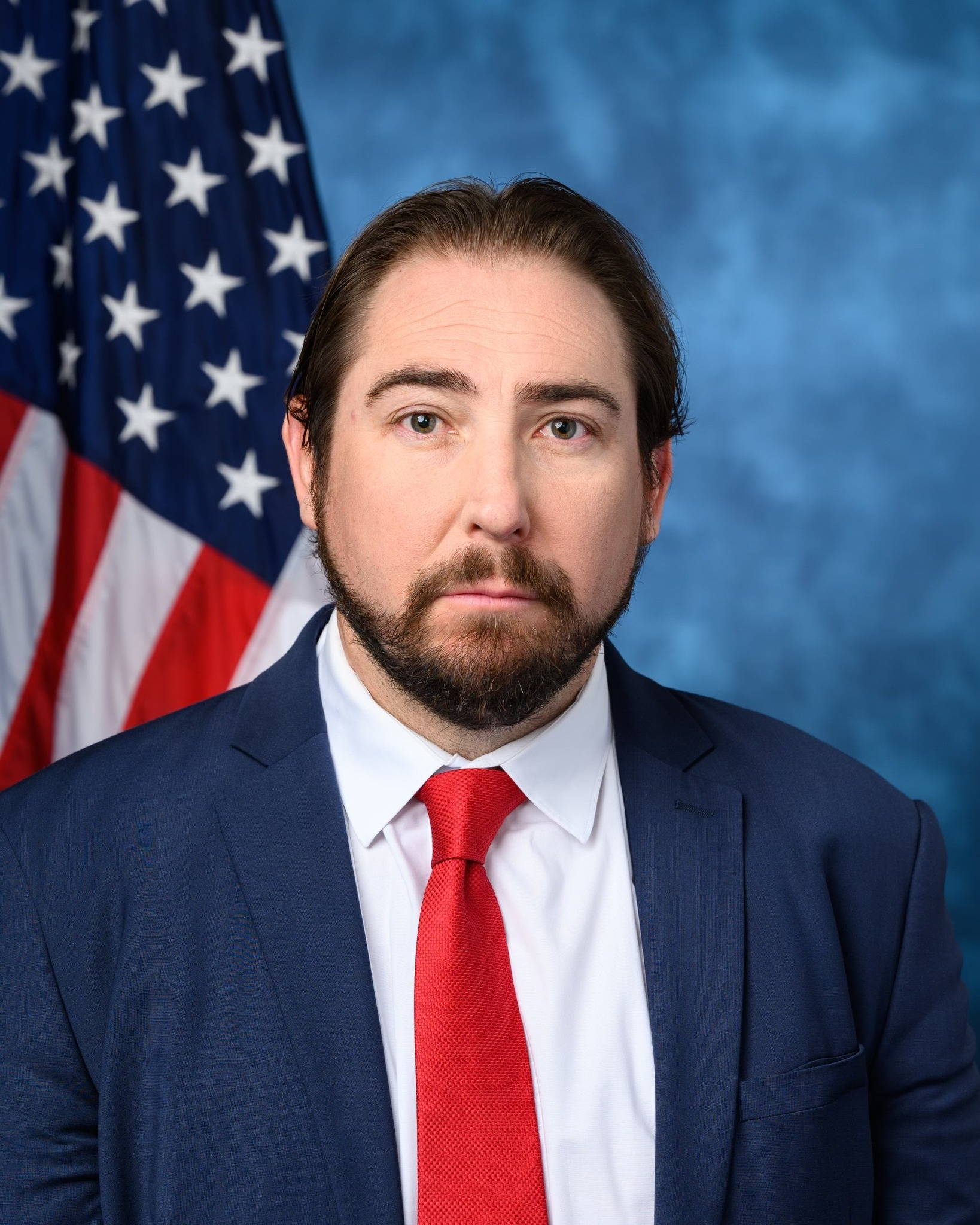
Eli Crane

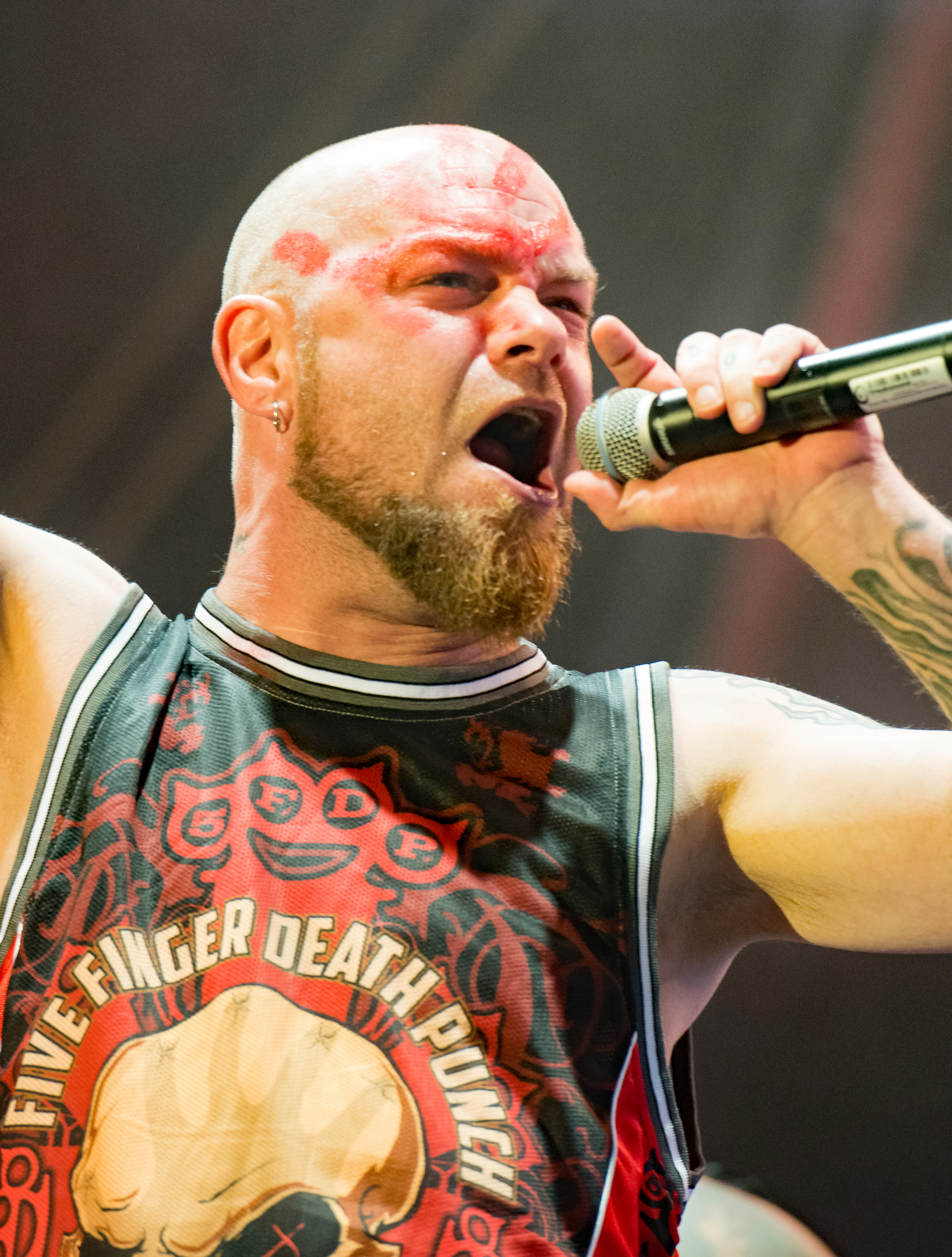
Ivan Moody

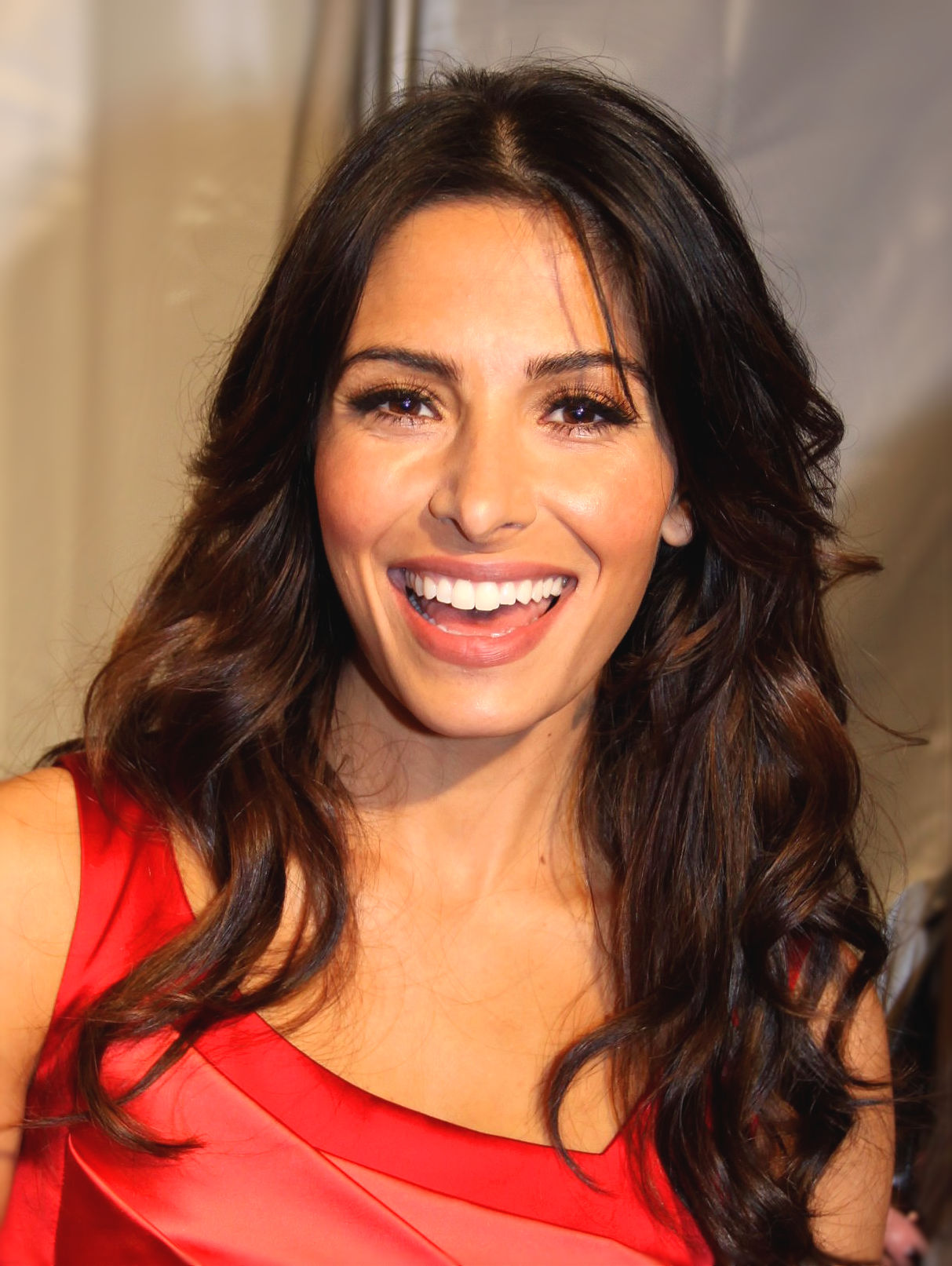
Sarah Shahi

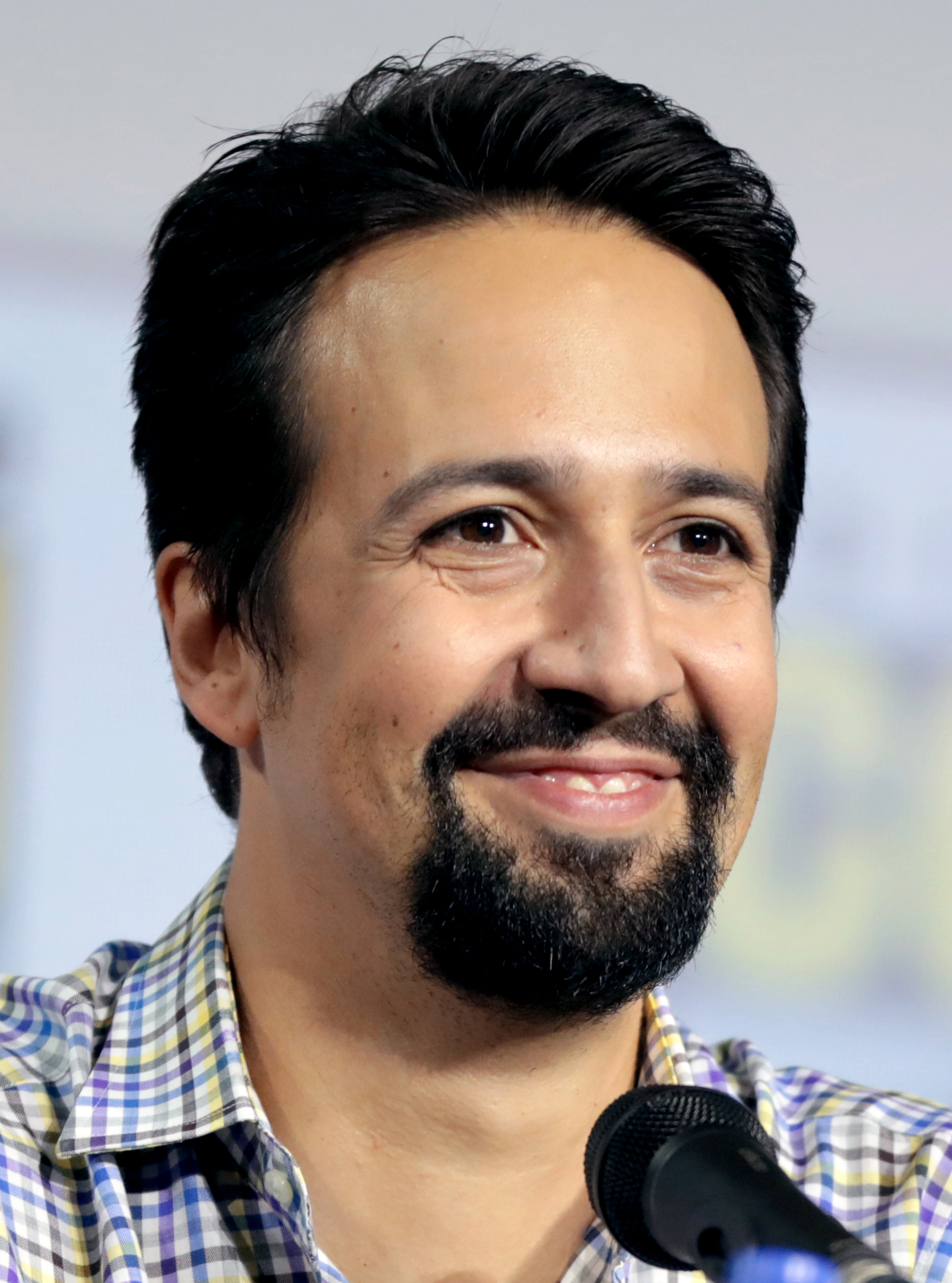
Lin-Manuel Miranda

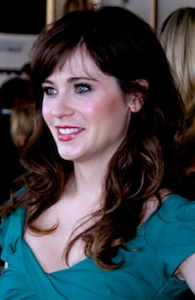
Zooey Deschanel

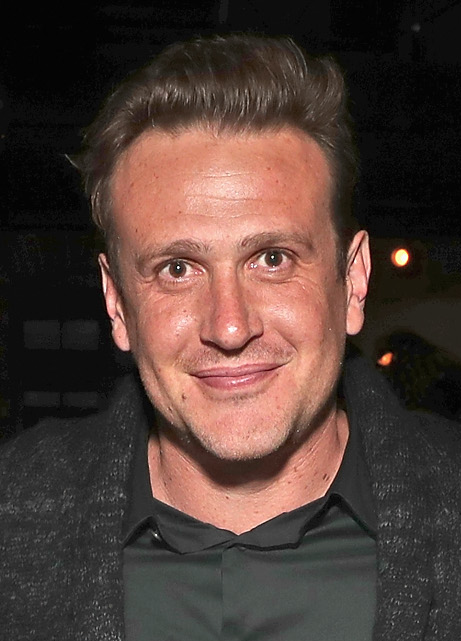
Jason Segel

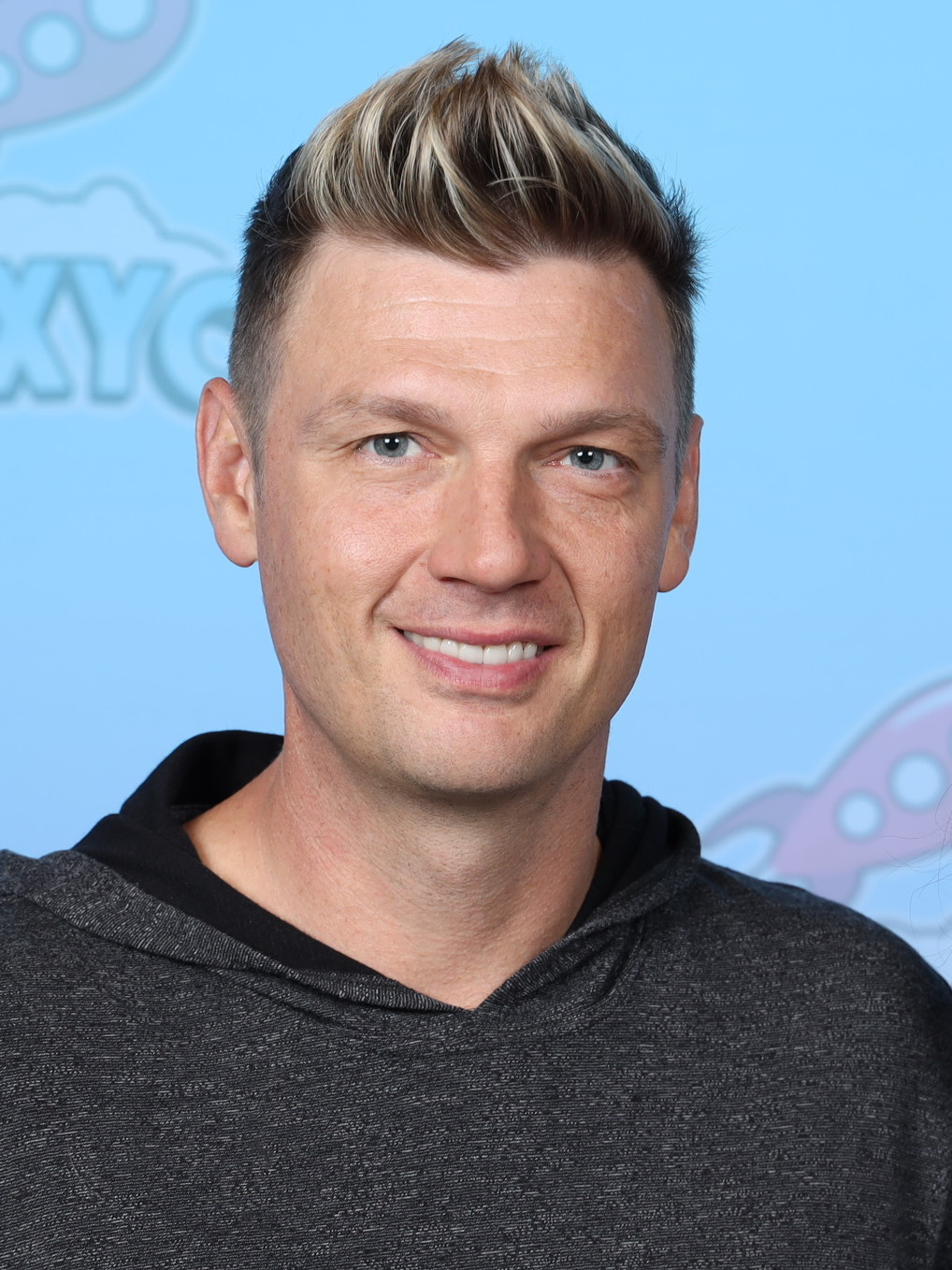
Nick Carter

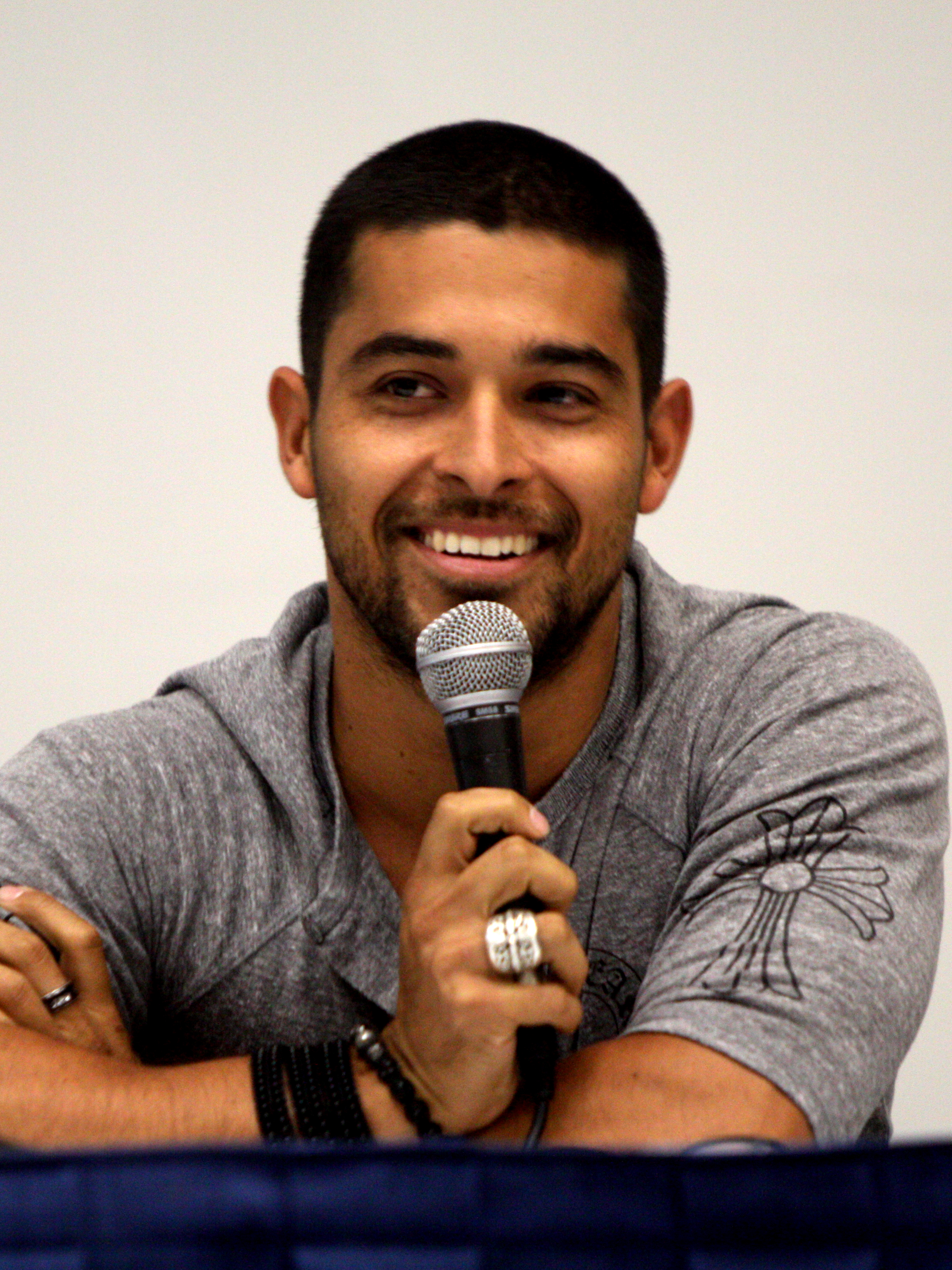
Wilmer Valderrama

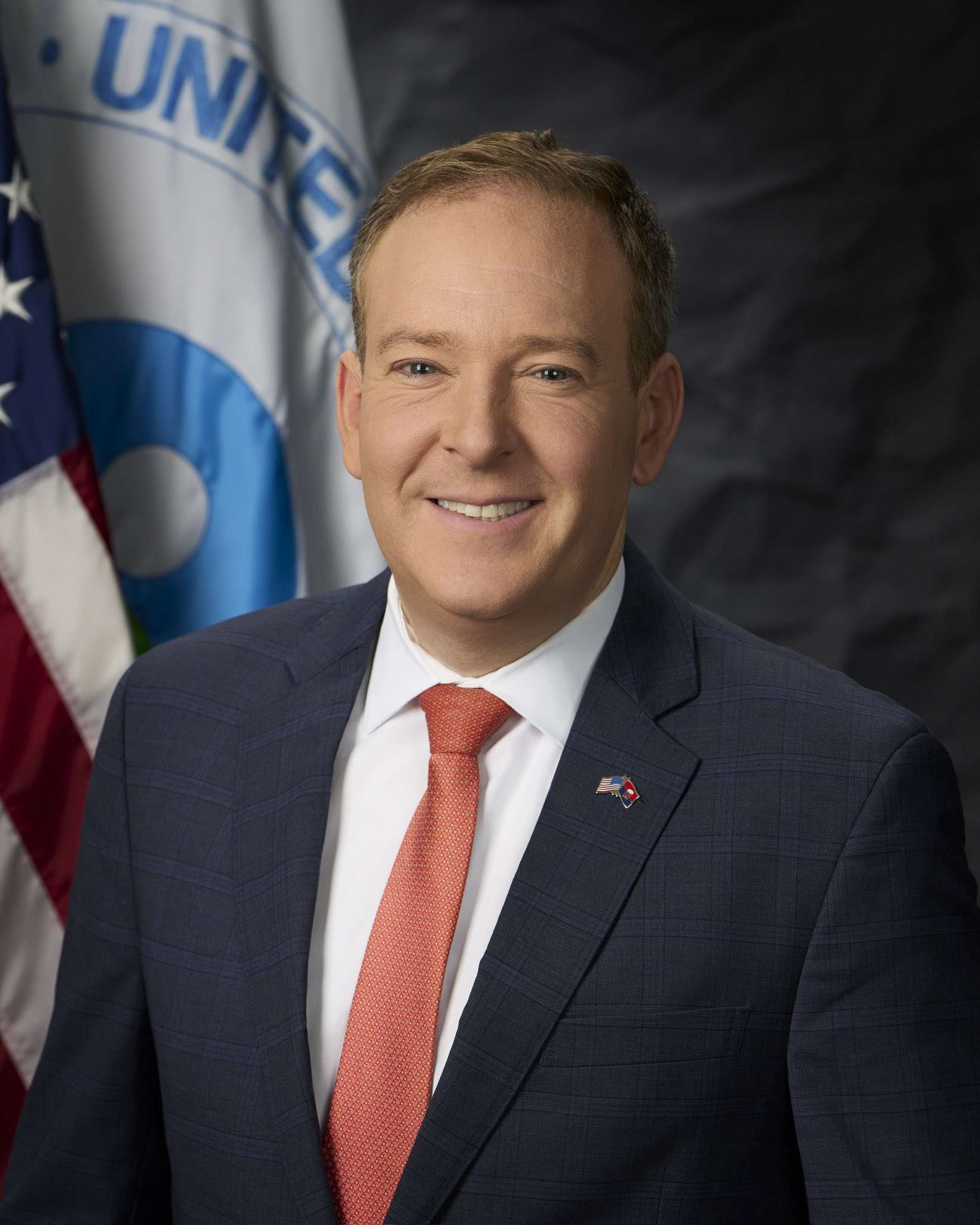
Lee Zeldin

- January 1
  - Maggie Behle, Paralympic alpine skier
  - Chris Brunt, soccer player
- January 2
  - Mac Danzig, mixed martial artist
  - Robert Rivas, politician
  - Brent Sass, dog musher
- January 3
  - Rob Arnold, lead guitarist for Chimaira (1999–2013) and rhythm guitarist for Six Feet Under (2011–2012)
  - Eli Crane, Navy SEAL and politician
  - Telly Leung, actor and singer/songwriter
  - Mary Wineberg, Olympic sprinter
- January 4
  - Erin Cahill, actress
  - D'Arcy Carden, actress and comedian
  - Greg Cipes, voice, film, and television actor
  - June Diane Raphael, actress, comedian, and screenwriter
- January 5
  - Garette Ratliff Henson, actor
  - Bennie Joppru, football player
  - Jill Krowinski, politician
- January 6 – Pascual Romero, musician
- January 7
  - Tonya Cooley, television personality
  - Ivan Moody, singer/songwriter and frontman for Five Finger Death Punch
- January 8
  - Shelly Boshart Davis, politician
- January 9 – Clark Barwick, mathematician and college professor
- January 10 – Sarah Shahi, actress
- January 11
  - James Adkisson, football player
  - Lovieanne Jung, softball player
- January 12
  - Amerie, singer
  - Cynthia Addai-Robinson, British-born actress
- January 13 – LaKisha Jones, singer
- January 14
  - Amber Brock, author
  - Cory Gibbs, soccer player
- January 15
  - Tommy Adams, basketball player
  - Scott Amron, conceptual artist and electrical engineer
  - Tom Baehr-Jones, physicist
  - Jason Capel, basketball coach
  - Ryan Kiesel, politician (d. 2025)
- January 16
  - Mike Ayers, ice hockey player
  - Lin-Manuel Miranda, playwright and composer
- January 17
  - T. J. Bohn, baseball player
  - Zooey Deschanel, actress and musician
  - Maksim Chmerkovskiy, Ukrainian-born dance champion, choreographer and instructor
- January 18
  - Illogic, hip hop artist
  - Julius Peppers, football player
  - Jason Segel, actor and comedian
- January 19 – Blake Burdette, rugby player and coach
- January 20
  - Karl Anderson, wrestler
  - Philippe Cousteau Jr., American-born, French oceanographer
- January 21
  - Abbie Betinis, composer
  - Darnell Boone, boxer
  - Troy Dumais, Olympic diver
- January 22
  - Jake Grove, football player
  - Christopher Masterson, actor and disc jockey
- January 23 – Marcus Arroyo, football player and coach
- January 24
  - Rocky Boiman, football player and sportscaster
  - Andrew Bolton, rower
- January 25
  - Ty Carter, Afghan War veteran and Medal of Honor Recipient
  - Michelle McCool, wrestler
- January 26
  - Jarrod Bernstein, political consultant
  - Albert Breer, football journalist
  - Phil Dalhausser, Swiss-born Olympic volleyball player
  - Danny Dietz, U.S. Navy SEAL (d. 2005)
- January 28
  - Jordan Black, football player
  - Nick Carter, Backstreet Boys member, musician, actor, and author
  - Jesse James Hollywood, drug dealer and convicted murderer
- January 29 – Jason James Richter, actor
- January 30
  - Lena Hall, actress and singer
  - Josh Kelley, singer/songwriter
  - Wilmer Valderrama, actor
  - Lee Zeldin, politician, Administrator of the Environmental Protection Agency (2025-present)
- January 31
  - James Adomian, stand-up comedian, actor, and impressionist
  - Stephen Baby, ice hockey player
  - Joel Brown, hurdler
  - April Lee Hernández, actress
  - Tiffany Limos, actress
  - Clarissa Ward, British-born television journalist

=== February ===
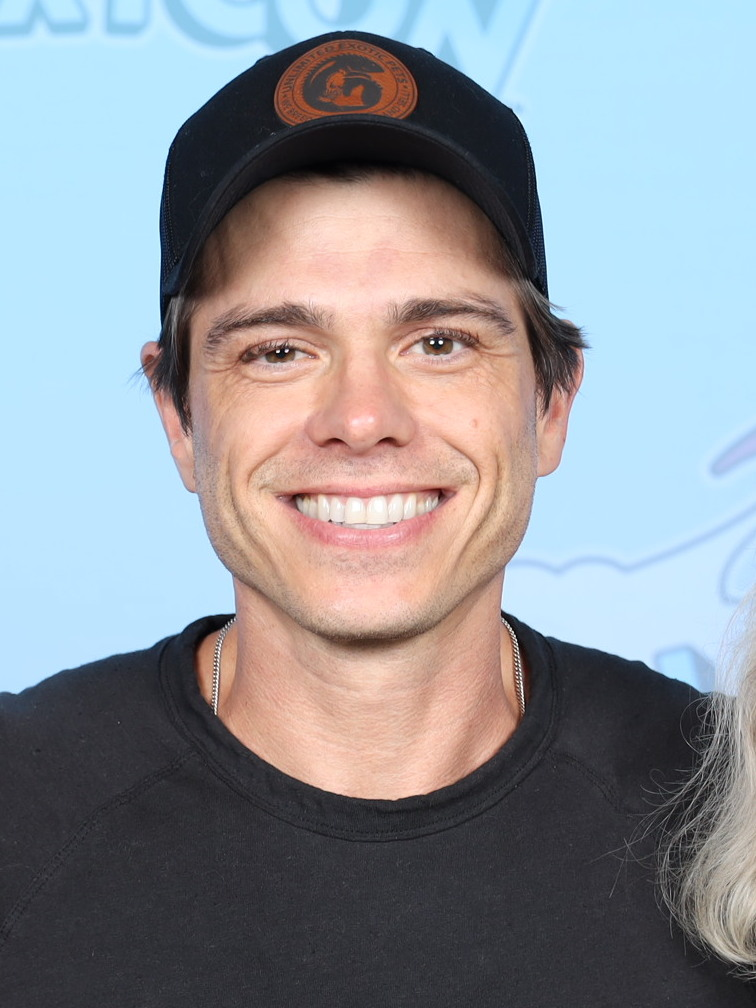
Matthew Lawrence

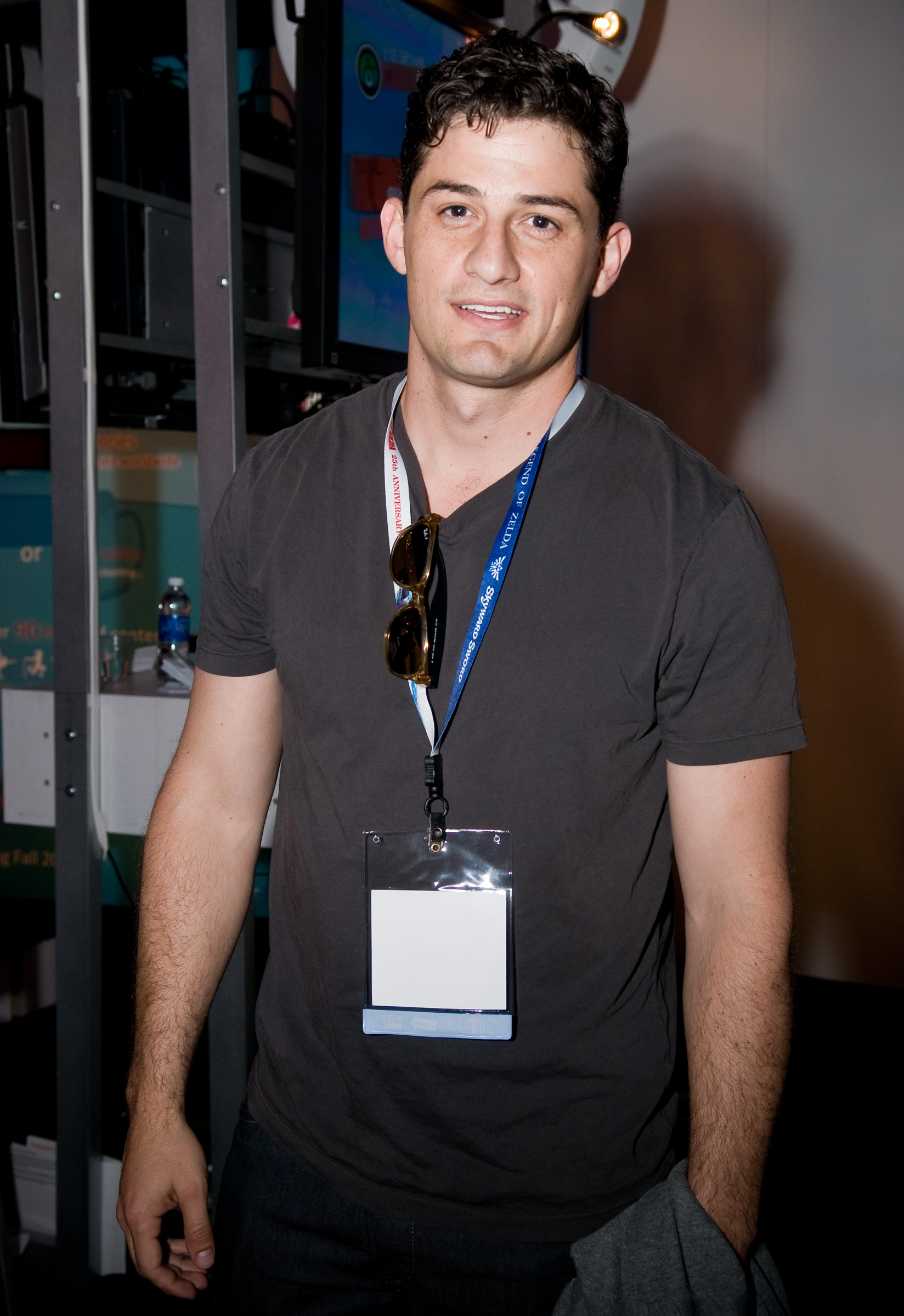
Enver Gjokaj

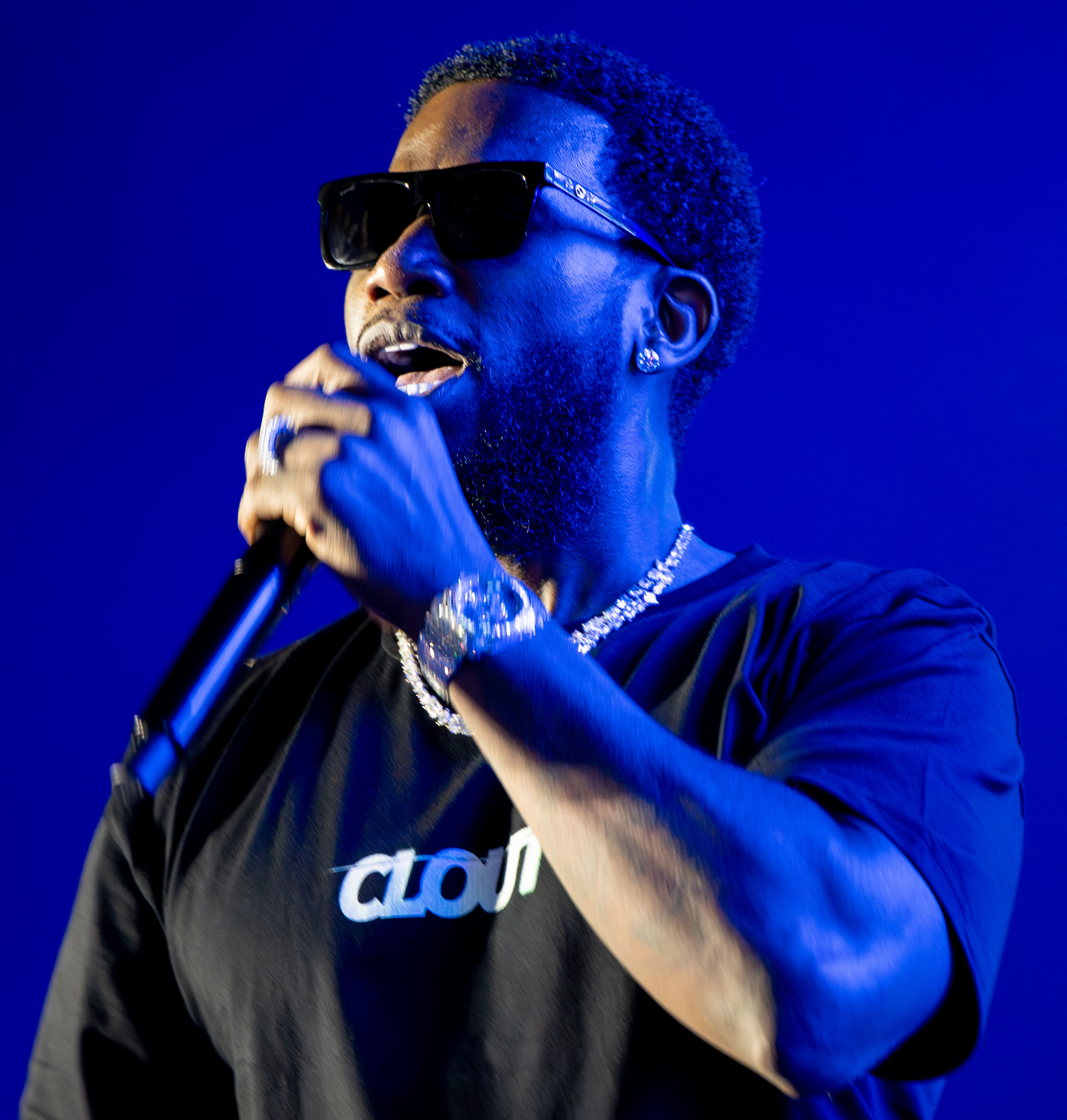
Gucci Mane

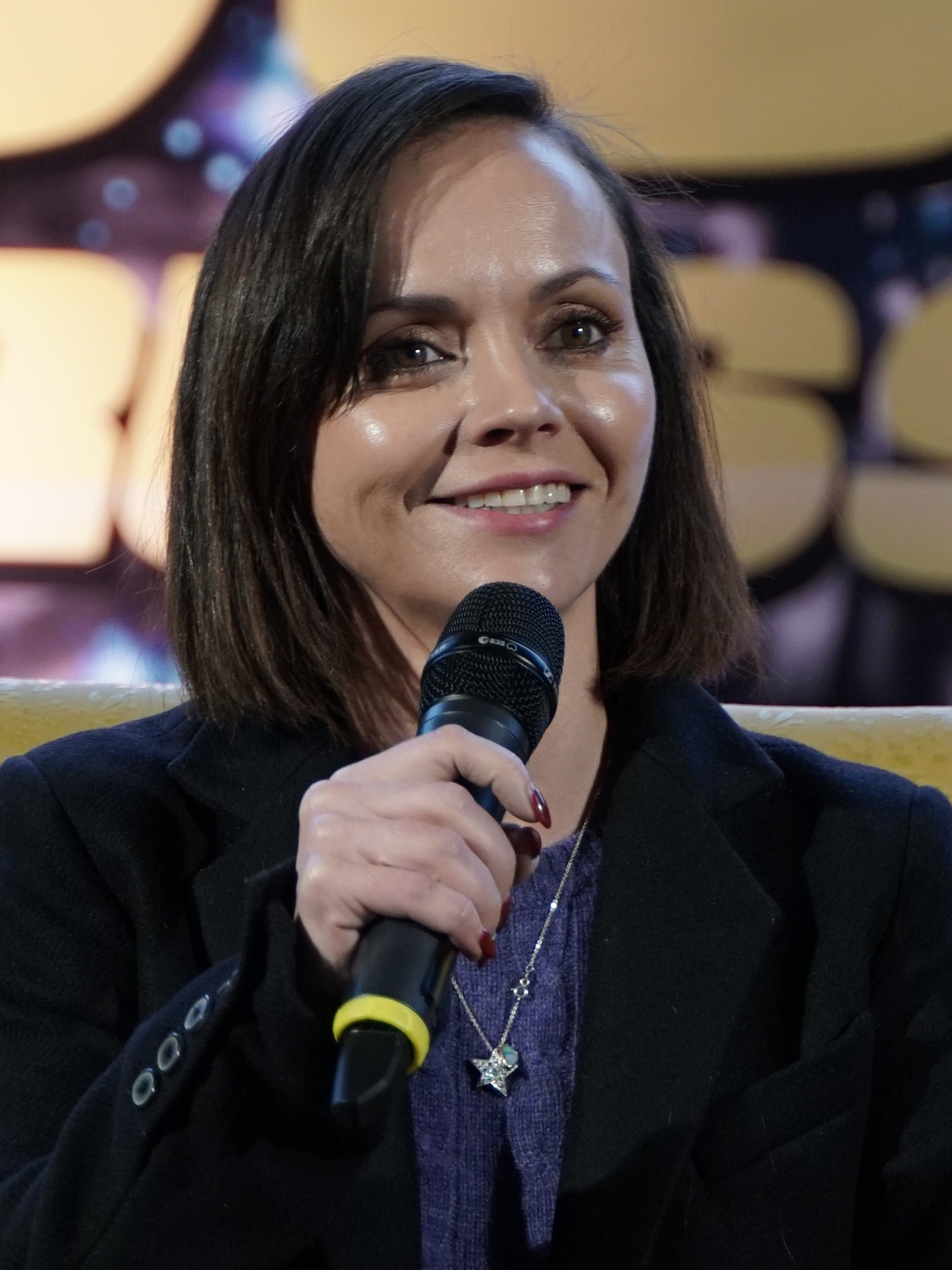
Christina Ricci

Kash Patel

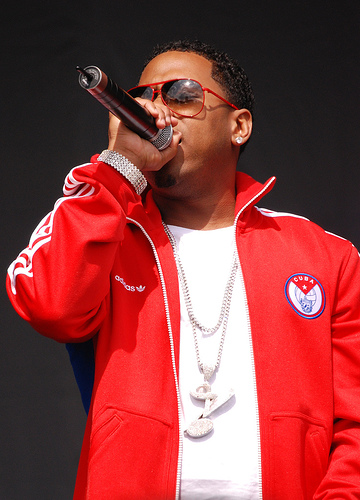
Bobby V

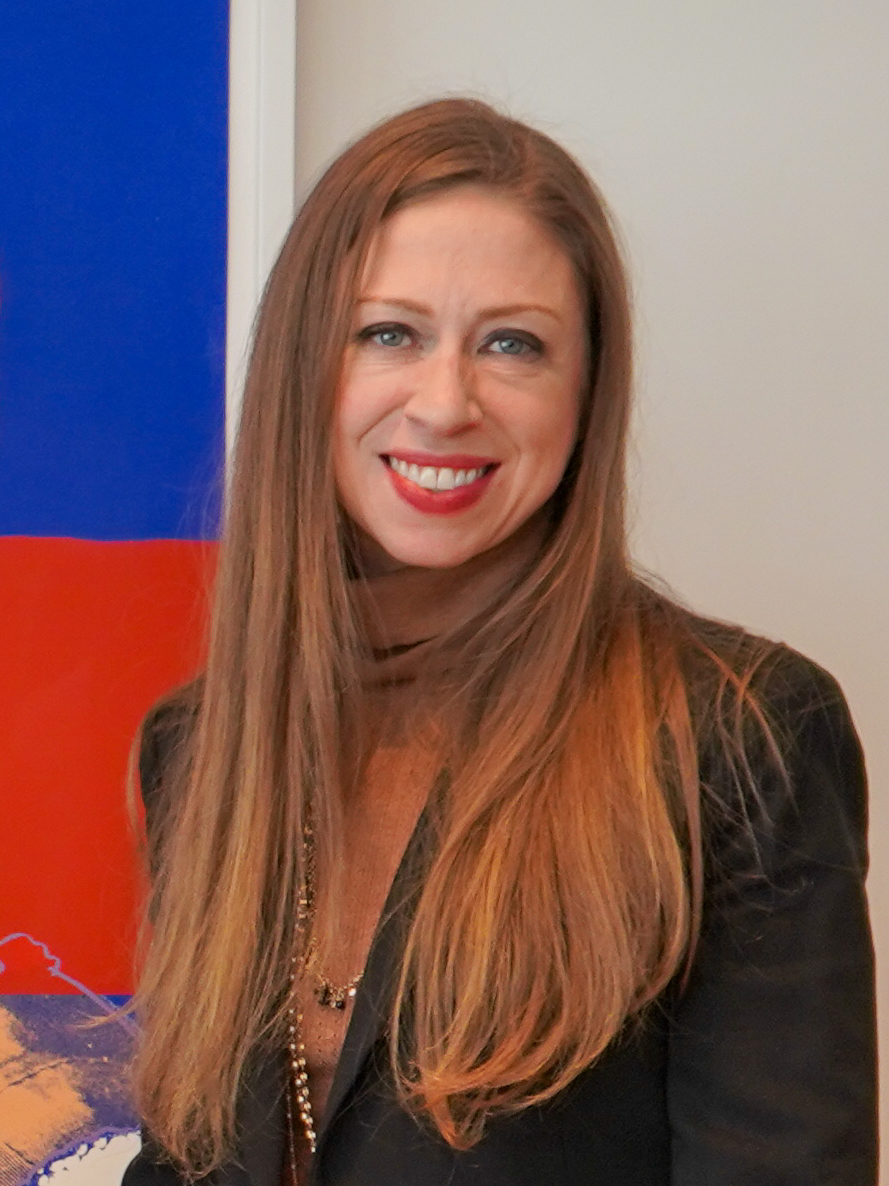
Chelsea Clinton

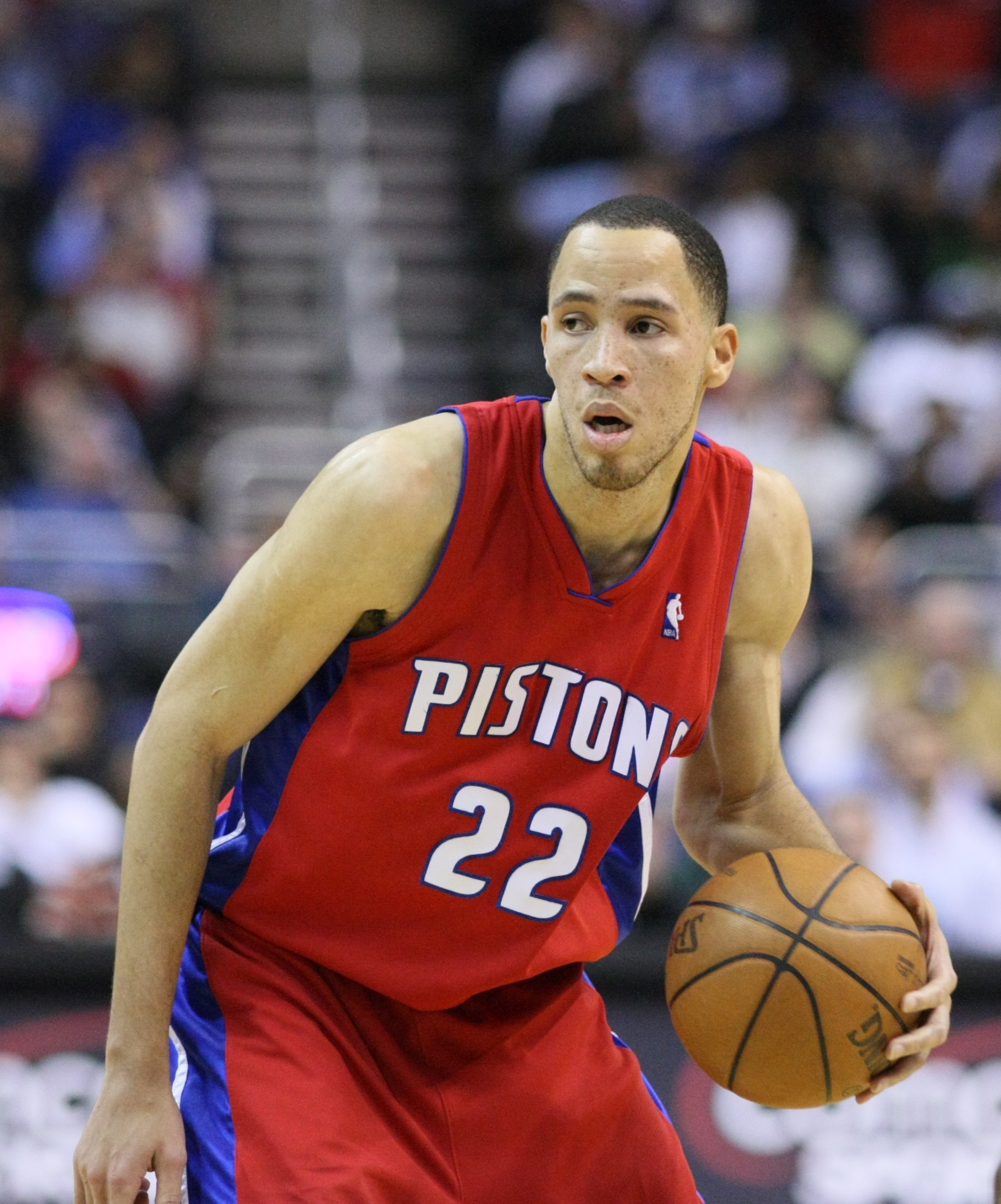
Tayshaun Prince

- February 1 – Kevin Cooke, politician
- February 2 – Erica Lee Carter, politician
- February 3
  - Felicia Ragland, basketball player
  - Skip Schumaker, baseball player
- February 4
  - David Bulow, soccer player and coach (d. 2021)
  - Brian Burg, basketball coach
  - Malik Evans, politician, mayor of Rochester, New York
- February 5 – Paul DelVecchio, reality show personality
- February 6
  - Thomas Boatwright, comic book artist and writer
  - Joel Bomgar, businessman and politician, founder of Bomgar Corporation
  - Chanel Branch, politician
  - Konnor, wrestler
  - Ryan Parmeter, wrestler
  - Luke Ravenstahl, politician, Mayor of Pittsburgh
- February 7
  - Kevin J. Boyle, politician
  - Richie Castellano, musician
  - Chris Moss, basketball player
  - William Tell, guitarist for Something Corporate
- February 8 – William Jackson Harper, actor
- February 9
  - Margarita Levieva, Russian-born actress
  - Shelly Martinez, wrestler and model
  - Lauren McFall, actress
  - Manu Raju, journalist
- February 11
  - Tony Bua, football player
  - Matthew Lawrence, actor
- February 12
  - Robin Bain, actress, writer, and director
  - Big Pooh, rapper
  - Enver Gjokaj, actor
  - Gucci Mane, rapper
  - Christina Ricci, actress
- February 14 – Santonio Beard, football player (d. 2022)
- February 15 – Conor Oberst, singer/songwriter
- February 16
  - Ashley Lelie, football player
  - Longineu W. Parsons III, drummer for Yellowcard (1997–2014)
- February 17 – Jason Ritter, actor and producer
- February 18
  - Salman Bhojani, Pakistani-born lawyer and politician
  - Regina Spektor, Russian-born singer/songwriter
- February 19 – Mike Miller, basketball player
- February 20 – Matt Behncke, soccer player and attorney
- February 21
  - Nat Baldwin, bassist, improvisor, and songwriter
  - Justin Roiland, animator, writer and voice actor
- February 22
  - Arnaz Battle, football player
  - Shamari Fears, singer-songwriter and actress
- February 25
  - Antonio Burks, basketball player
  - Chris & Christy Knowings, twin actors
  - Kash Patel, lawyer and Director of the FBI (2025-present)
- February 26
  - Brett Ballard, basketball coach
  - Steve Blake, basketball player
- February 27
  - Brandon Beemer, actor and model
  - Bobby V, R&B singer
  - Cyrus Bolooki, drummer for New Found Glory
  - Chelsea Clinton, daughter of U.S. President Bill Clinton and U.S. Secretary of State Hillary Clinton
- February 28
  - Darian Barnes, football player
  - Seth Bogart, artist and musician
  - Charles Halford, actor
  - Tayshaun Prince, basketball player
- February 29
  - Peter Scanavino, actor
  - Taylor Twellman, soccer player and sportscaster

=== March ===
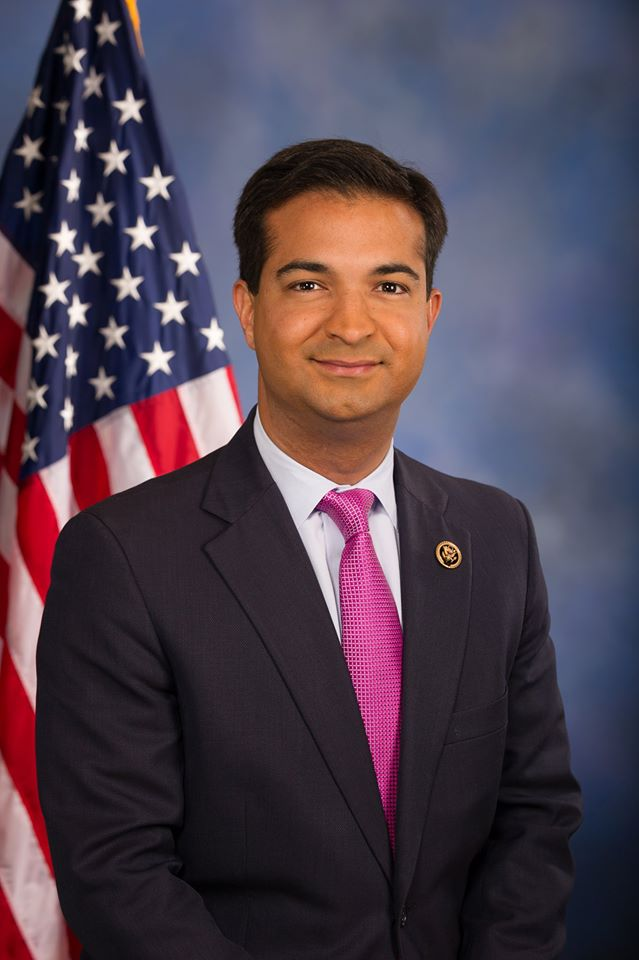
Carlos Curbelo

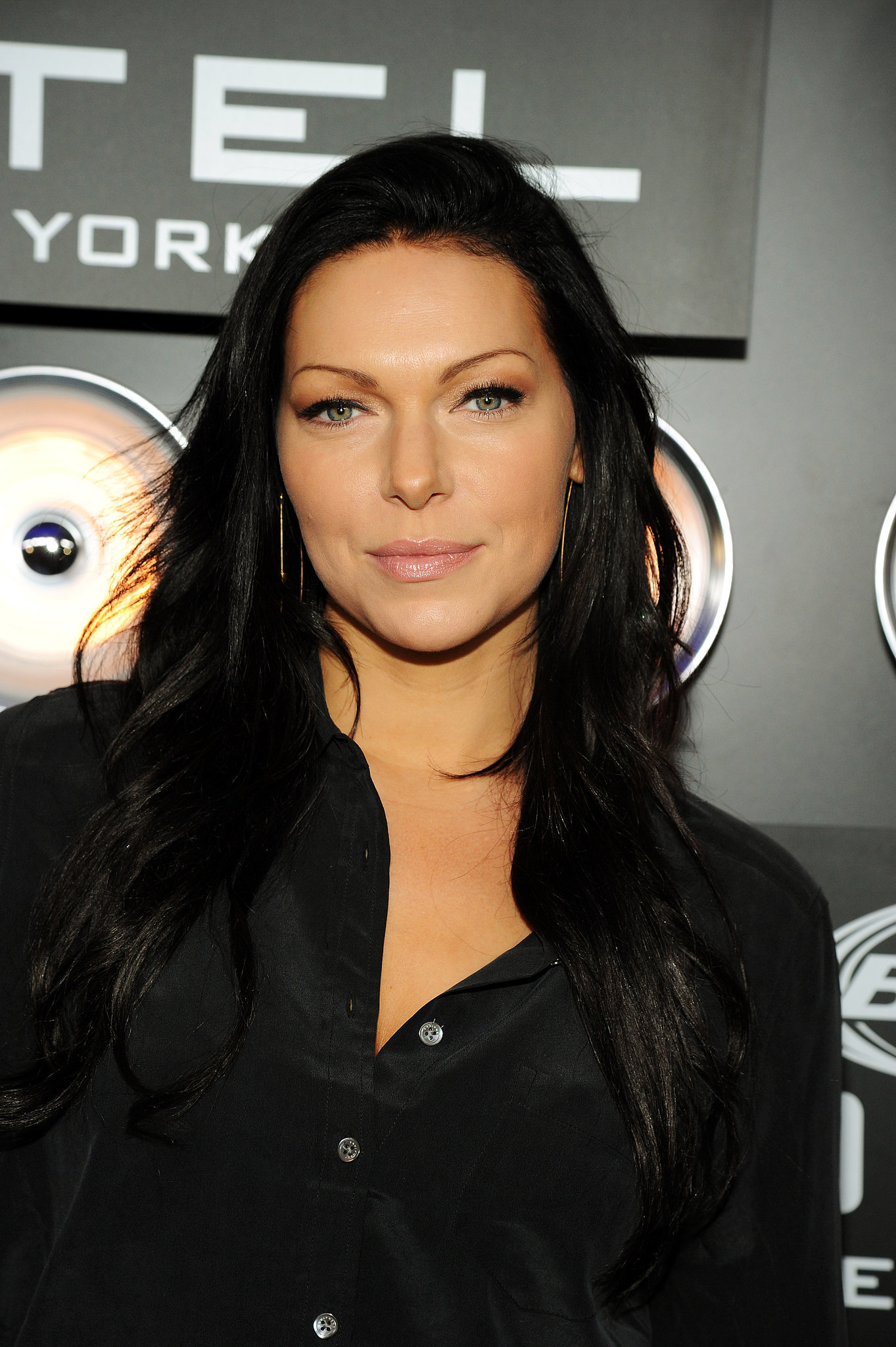
Laura Prepon

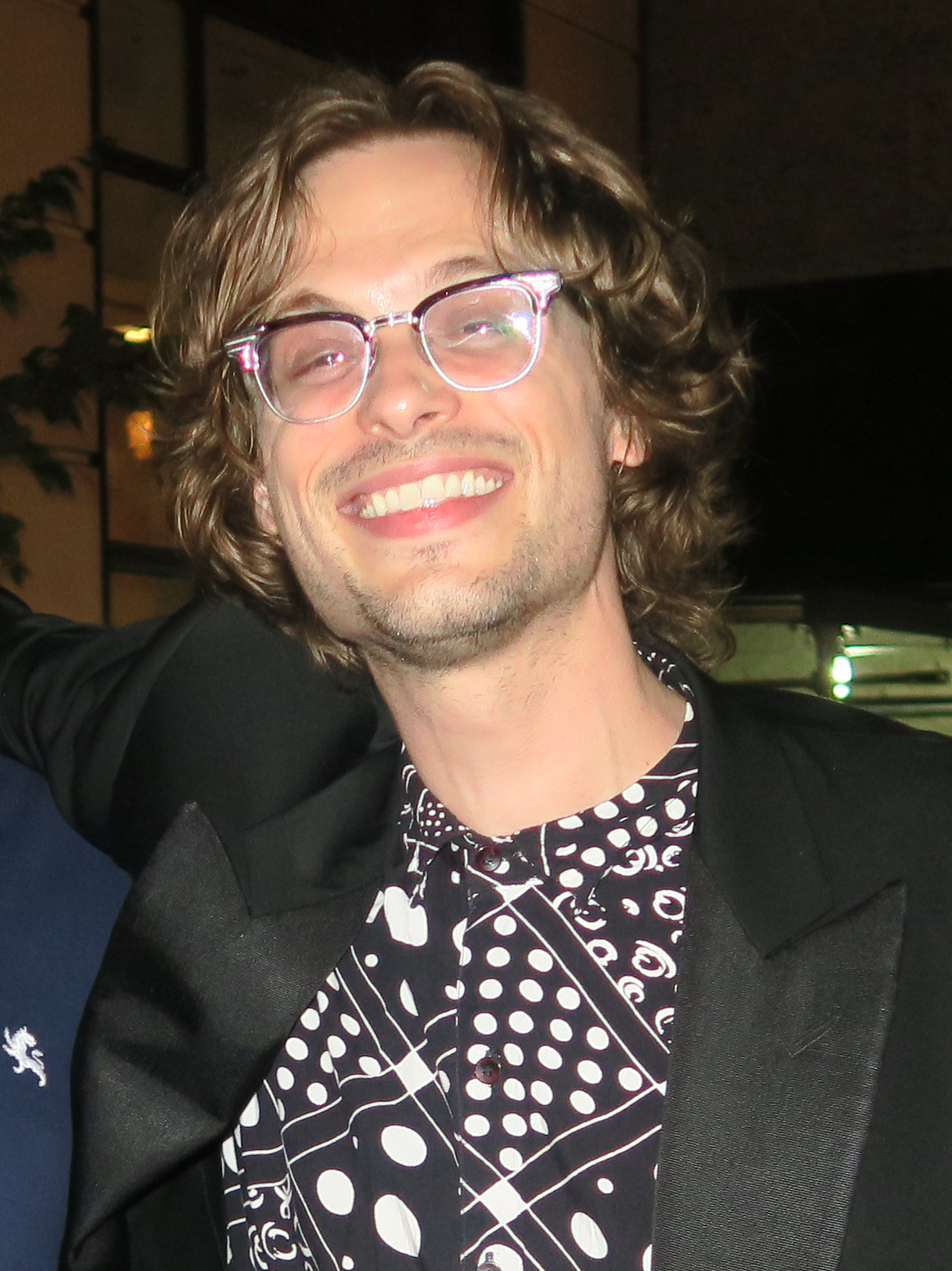
Matthew Gray Gubler

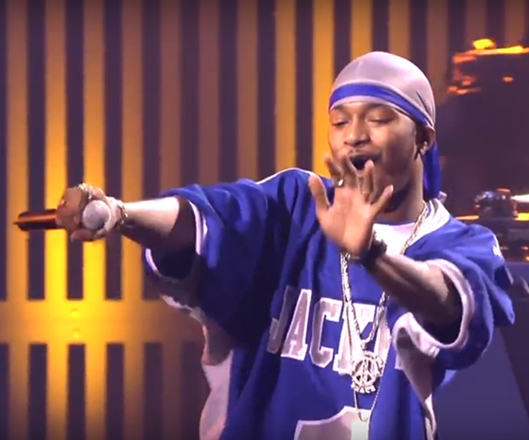
Chingy

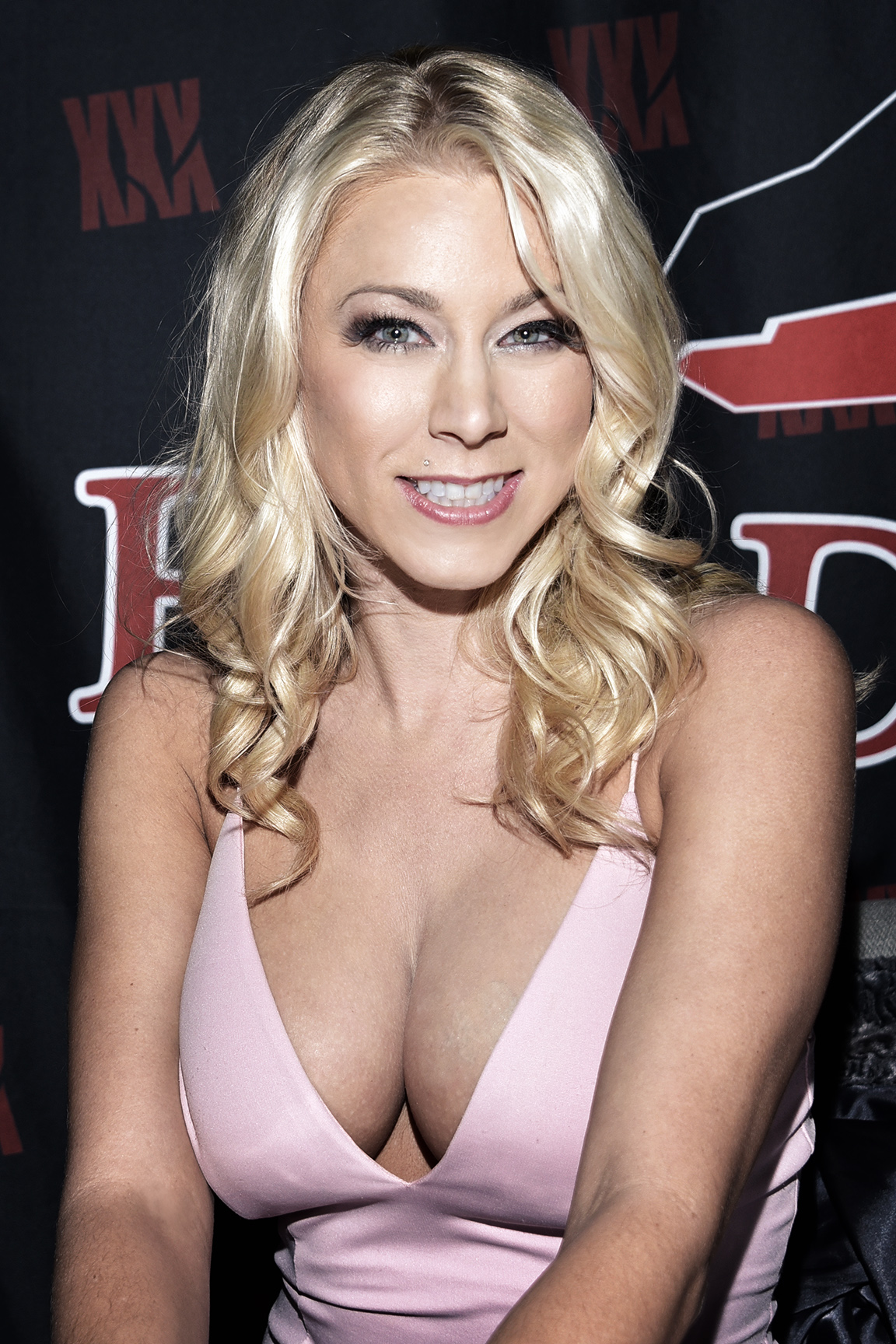
Katie Morgan

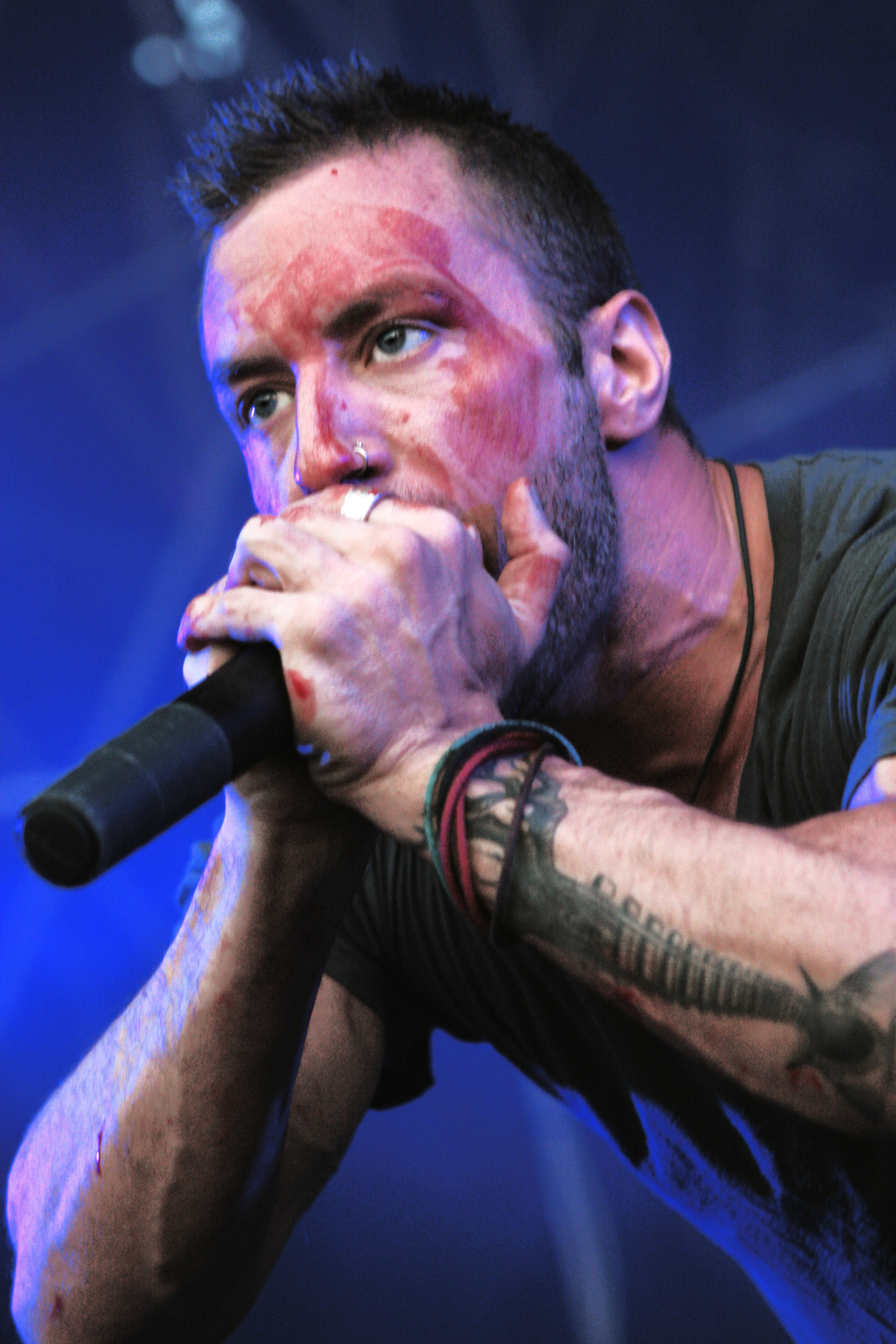
Greg Puciato

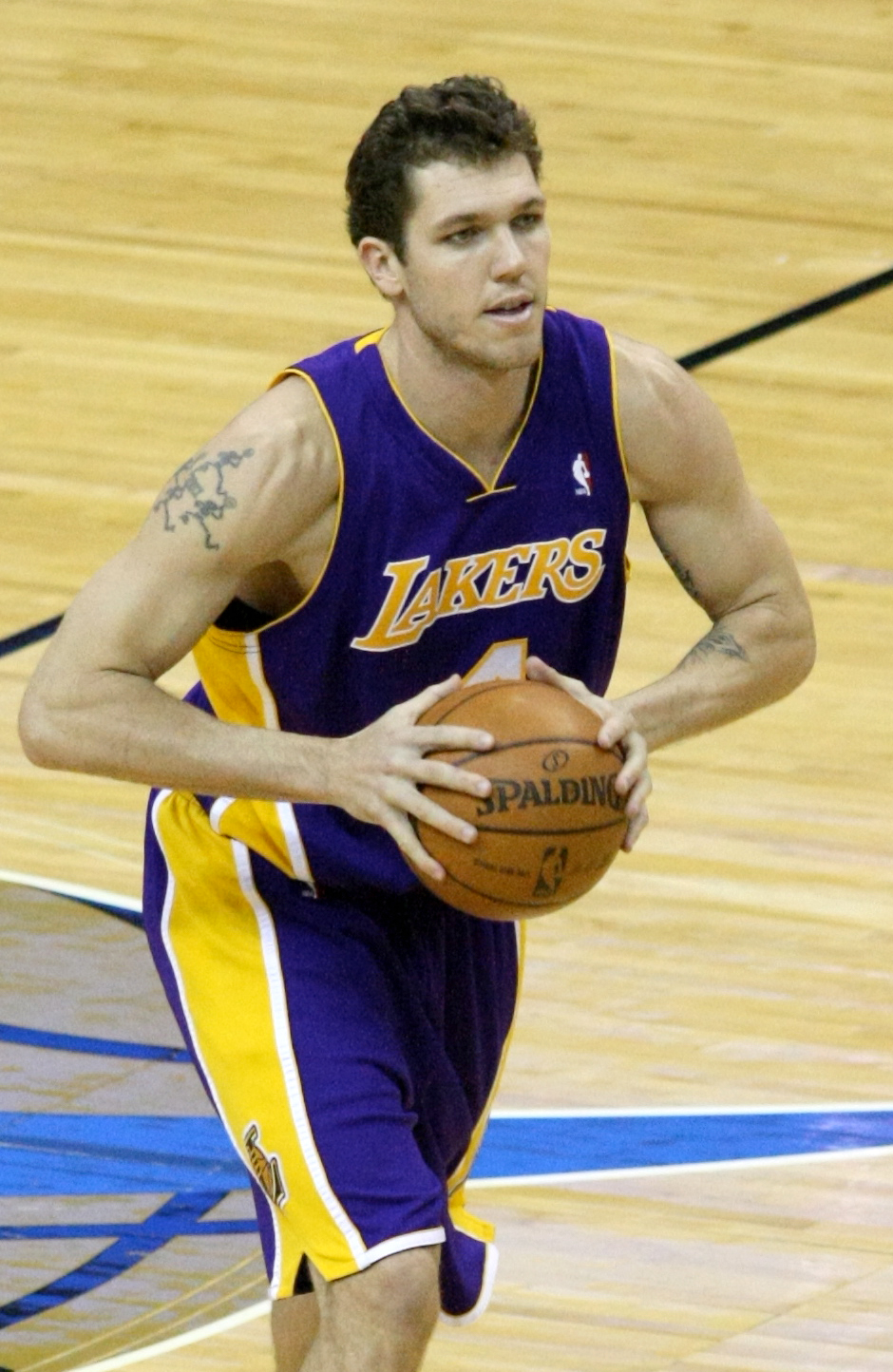
Luke Walton

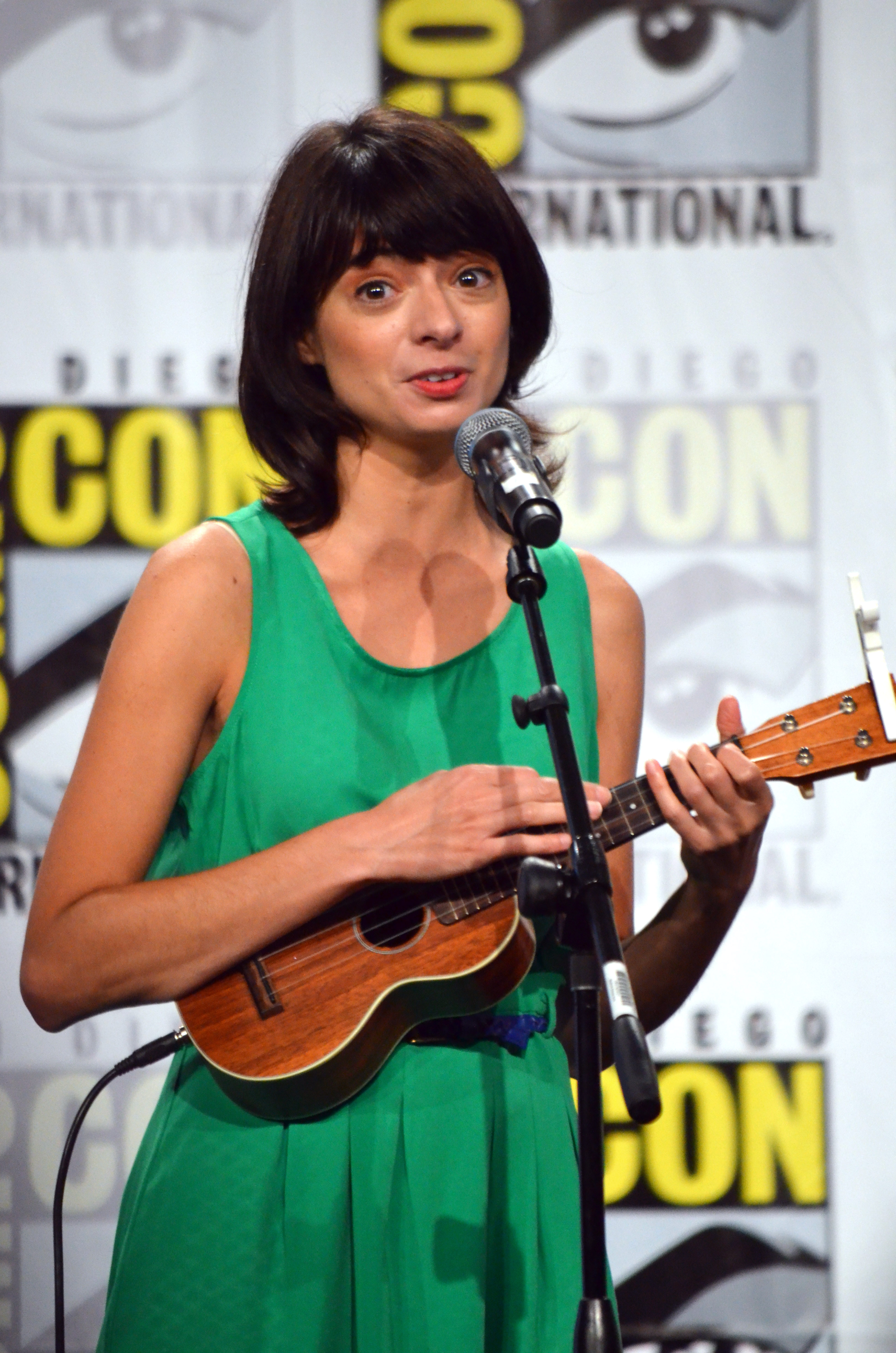
Kate Micucci

- March 1 – Carlos Curbelo, politician
- March 2 – Edmund McMillen, video game designer
- March 3
  - Kevin Aldridge, football player
  - Kevin Burns, mixed martial artist
  - Mason Unck, Professional football player
  - Scott Voyles, conductor
  - Katherine Waterston, British-born actress
- March 4
  - Jack Hannahan, baseball player
  - J. D. Scholten, politician
  - Peter Hollens, singer/songwriter, producer and entrepreneur
- March 5
  - Yan Bartelemí, Cuban-born boxer
  - Shay Carl, vlogger and YouTube personality
  - William Owens, Navy SEAL (d. 2017)
- March 6
  - Daniel Arnold, photographer
  - Awon, hip hop artist
  - Blake Gottesman, politician
- March 7
  - Jeff Babcock, stock car racing driver
  - Laura Prepon, actress, director, and author
- March 9
  - Matt Barnes, basketball player
  - Matthew Gray Gubler, actor and filmmaker
  - Gina Keatley, nutritionist
- March 10
  - Mike Andrade, politician
  - Jen Atkin, influential hairstylist, entrepreneur, and columnist
  - Chingy, rapper, singer and actor
  - Jesse Dee, singer
  - Ahmaad Galloway, football player and coach (d. 2023)
- March 11
  - Brent Barton, politician
  - Neal Brown, football player and coach
  - Chris Burke, baseball player
- March 12
  - Christopher Bolduc, opera baritone singer
- March 13
  - Ahmad D. Brooks, football player
  - Caron Butler, basketball player
  - Molly Stanton, actress
  - Joshua Wade, serial killer (d. 2024)
- March 14 – Willie Hurst, football player
- March 15
  - Beth Bauer, golfer
  - DJ Buddha, DJ, record producer, radio personality, music publisher, and record executive
  - Freddie Bynum, baseball player
  - Erica Grow, meteorologist
  - Josh Levin, writer and executive editor
- March 16 – Todd Heap, football player
- March 17
  - Danny Califf, soccer player
  - Katie Morgan, porn actress and radio host
- March 19 – Theo Von, television personality and comedian
- March 20
  - Ricco Barrino, R&B singer/songwriter
  - Jamal Crawford, basketball player
  - Mikey Day, actor, comedian and writer
- March 21 – Jo Baker, English-born make-up artist
- March 22
  - Shannon Bex, singer and member of Danity Kane (2005-2019)
  - Bobby Blizzard, football player and coach
- March 24
  - Black Pegasus, rapper and CEO of Brass Knuckle Entertainment
  - Dina Rizzo, field hockey player
- March 25 – Neal Cotts, baseball player
- March 26
  - John Bradford, soccer player
  - Margaret Brennan, journalist
  - Rosendo Rodriguez, serial killer (died 2018)
  - Son Ho-young, singer in g.o.d
- March 27 – Greg Puciato, heavy metal musician and frontman for The Dillinger Escape Plan
- March 28
  - Rod Ferrell, convicted murderer
  - Rosie Mercado, plus-size model
  - Nick Mondo, wrestler
  - Luke Walton, basketball coach
- March 29
  - Reuben 'Bonyx' Armstrong, producer and R&B artist
  - China P. Arnold, convicted murderer
  - Molly Brodak, poet, writer, and baker (d. 2020)
- March 30
  - Bryan Anderson, football player
  - Fiona Gubelmann, actress
- March 31
  - Kate Micucci, actress and voice artist
  - Trenyce, singer

=== April ===
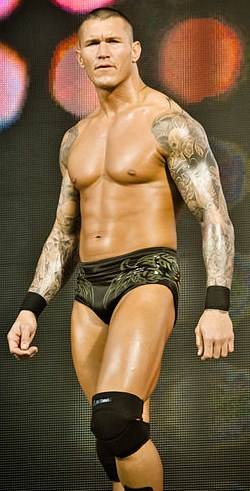
Randy Orton

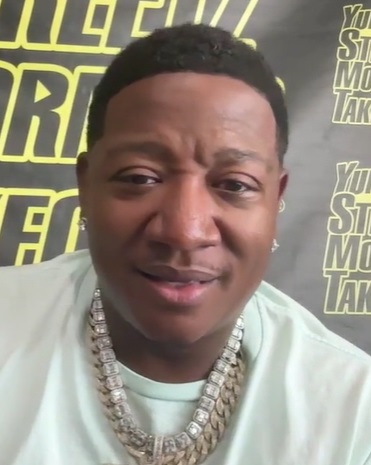
Yung Joc

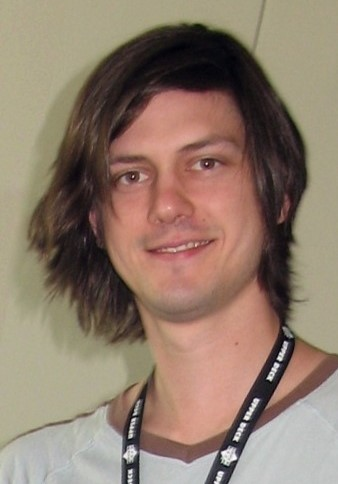
Trevor Moore

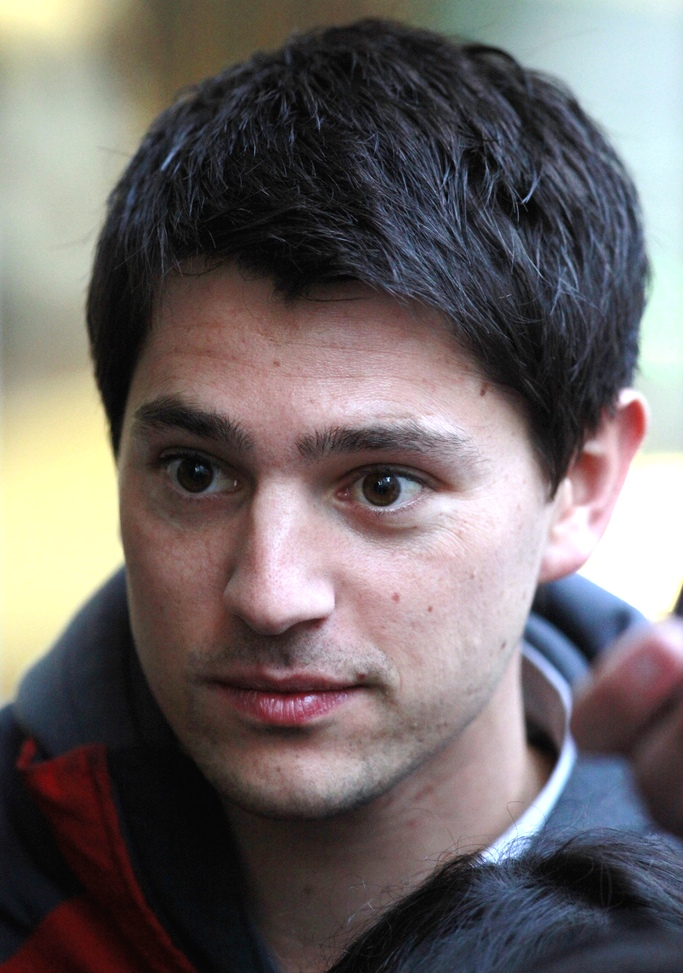
Nicholas D'Agosto

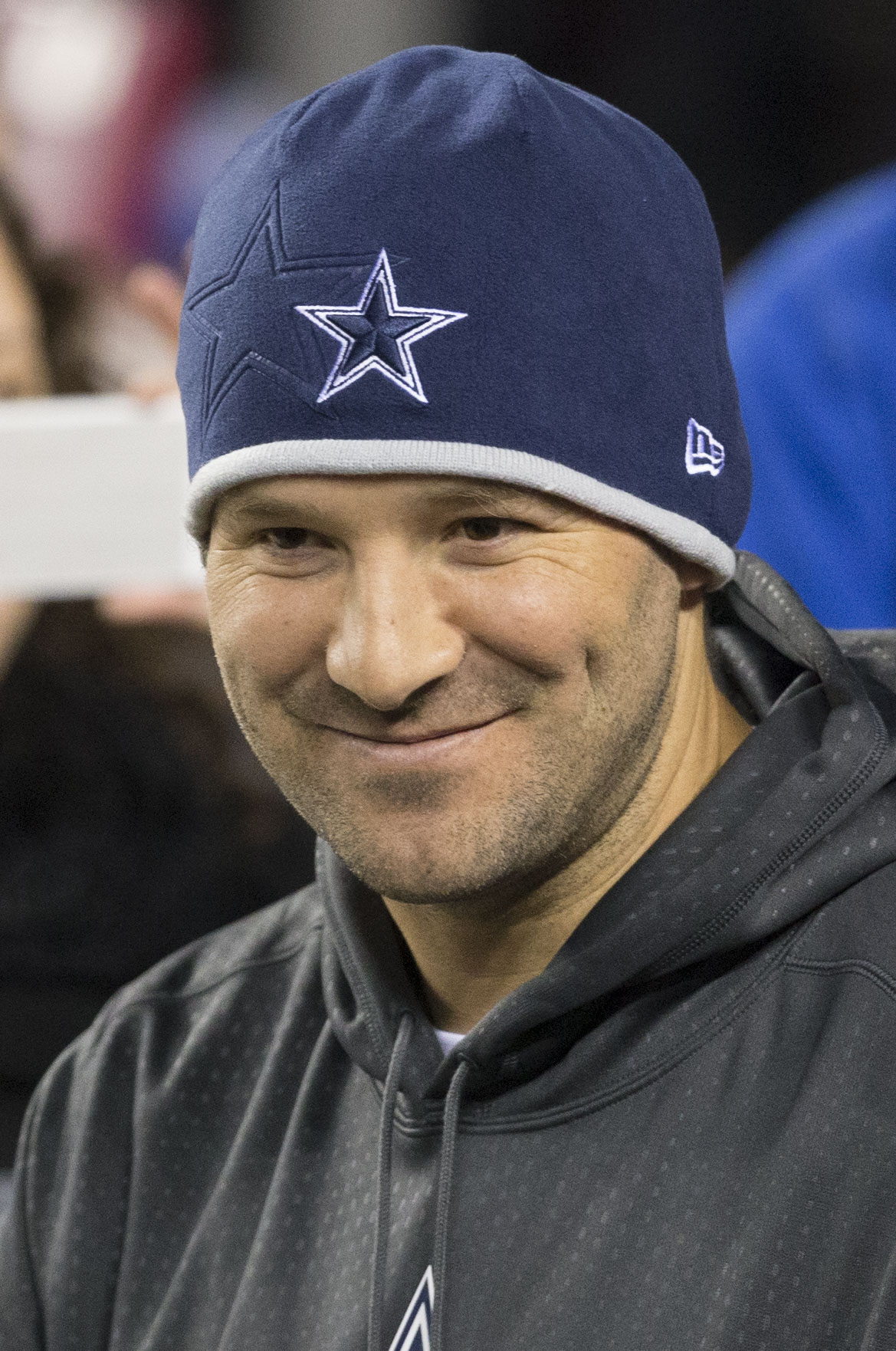
Tony Romo

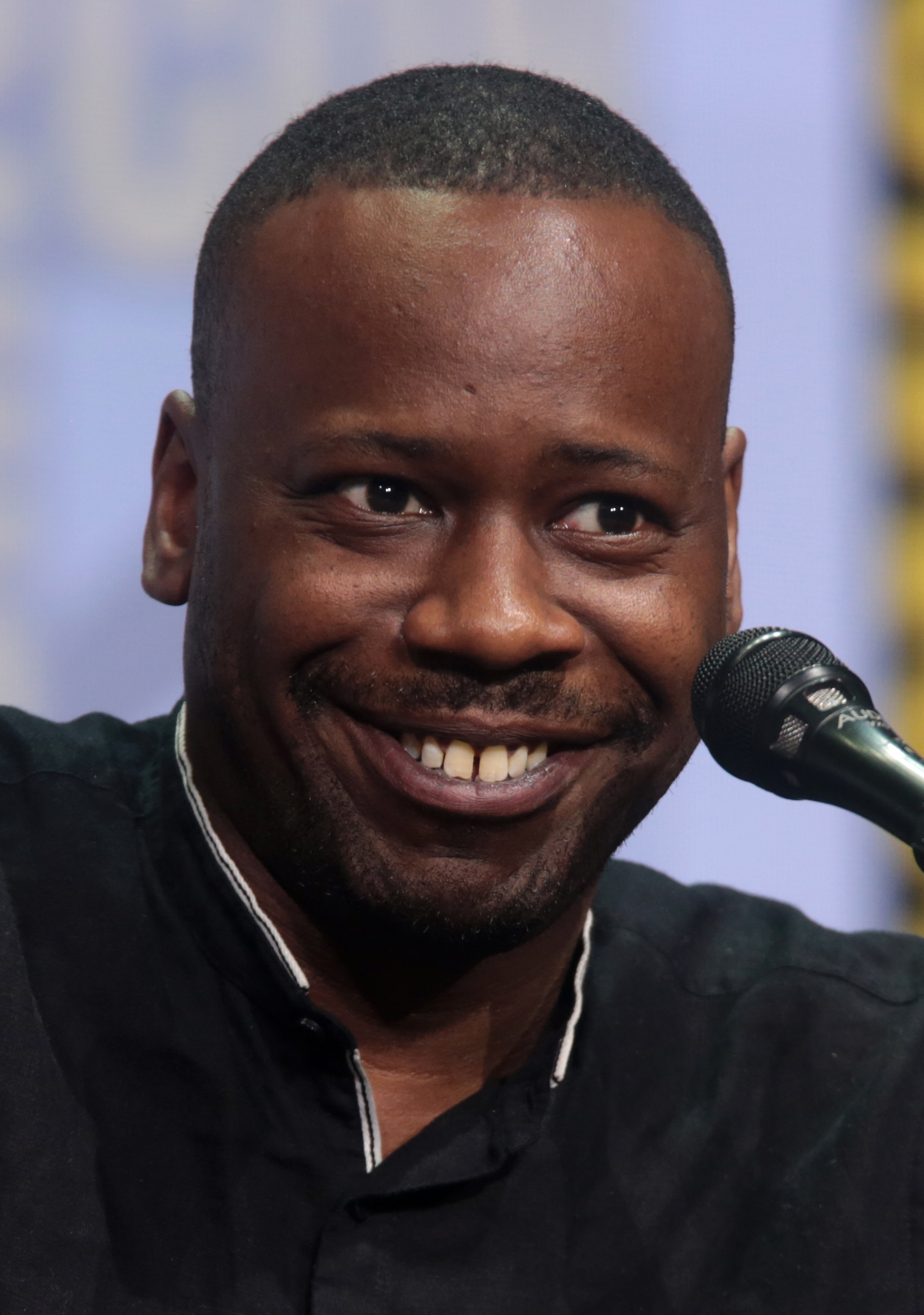
Malcolm Barrett

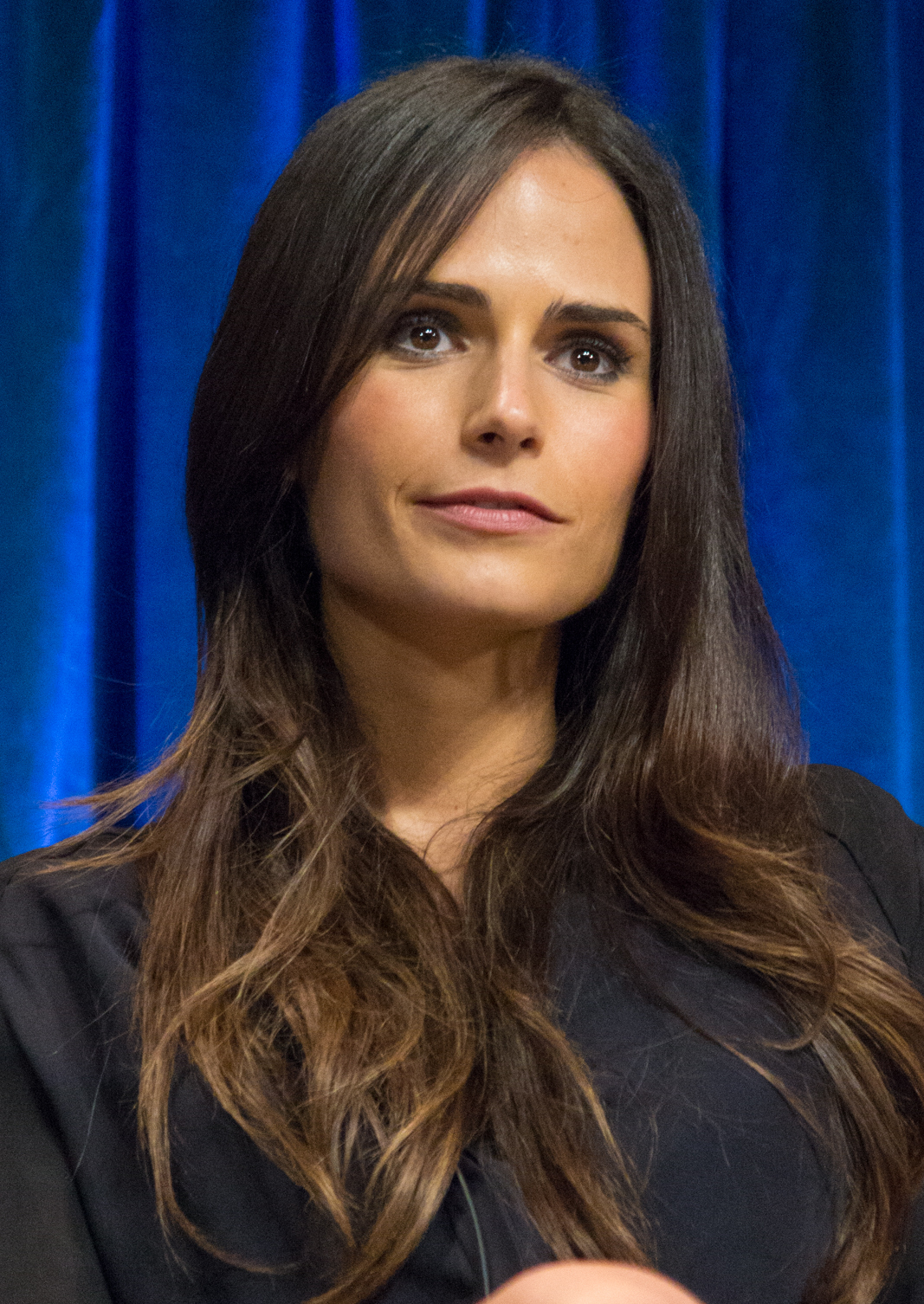
Jordana Brewster

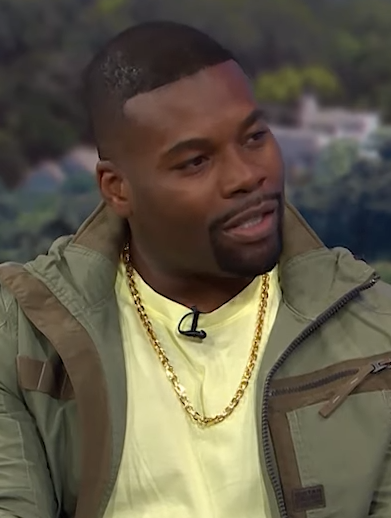
Amin Joseph

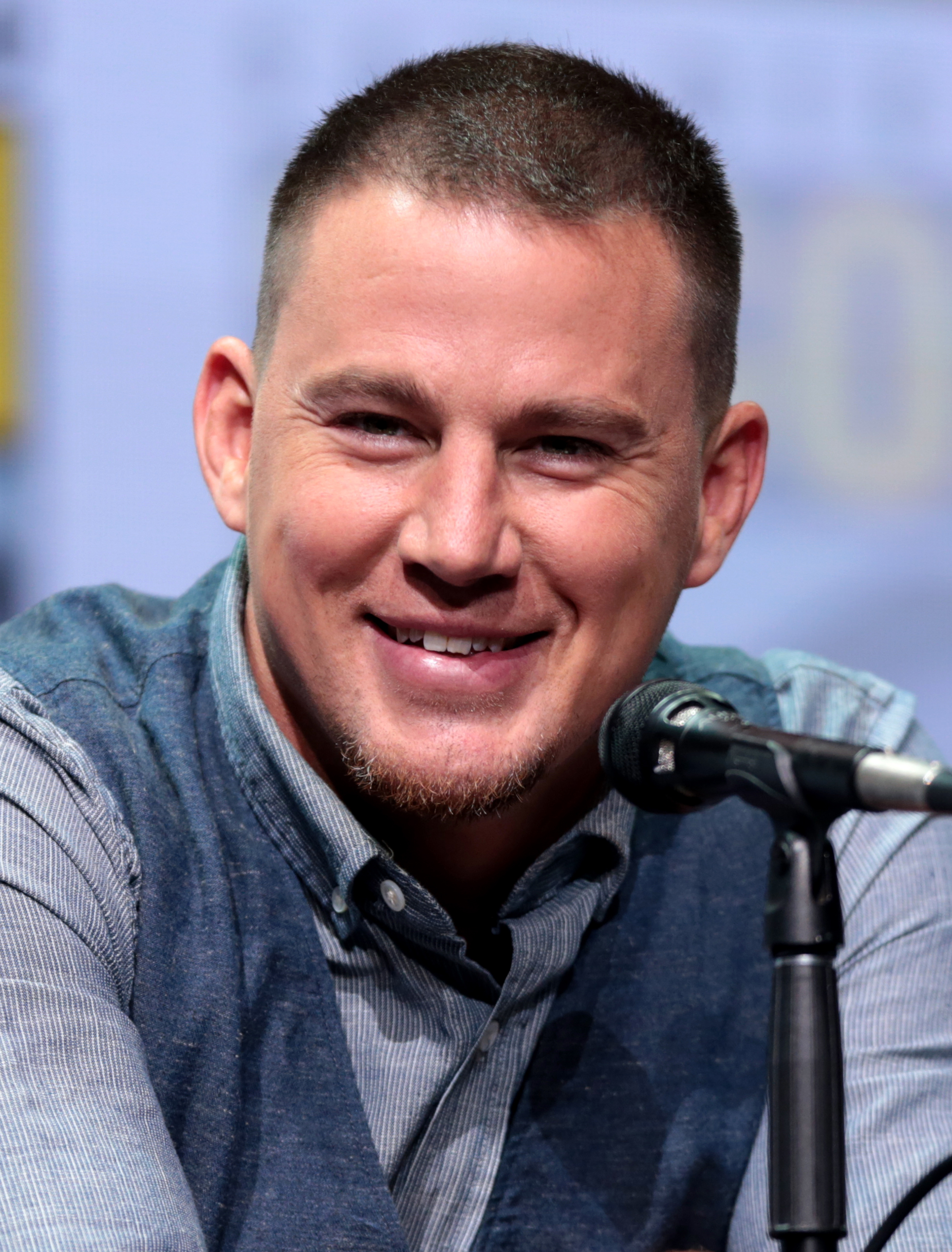
Channing Tatum

- April 1
  - Bryan Buffington, actor
  - Kip Moore, country singer/songwriter
  - Bijou Phillips, actress
  - Randy Orton, wrestler and actor
- April 2
  - Bobby Bones, radio personality
  - Jeremy Bloom, football player and skier
  - Jack Evans, wrestler
  - Yung Joc, rapper
  - Ricky Hendrick, race car driver (d. 2004)
- April 3
  - Trevor Moore, actor and comedian (d. 2021)
  - Brandan Schieppati, singer, bodybuilder, personal trainer, and frontman for Bleeding Through and Eighteen Visions (1997–2002)
- April 5
  - Erik Audé, actor, stuntman, restaurateur, and poker player
  - Matt Bonner, basketball player
  - Mary Katharine Ham, journalist
- April 7
  - David Otunga, wrestler
- April 8
  - Eric Aiken, boxer
  - Carrie Savage, actress
- April 9
  - Yoanna House, model and television personality
  - Rachel Specter, actress
- April 10
  - Josh Burkman, mixed martial artist
  - Kasey Kahne, racing driver
- April 11 – Mark Teixeira, baseball player
- April 12 – Elliot Ackerman, author and former Marine Corps Special Operations Team Leader
- April 13
  - Colleen Clinkenbeard, voice actress
  - Kelli Giddish, actress
- April 14
  - Win Butler, American-born Canadian singer/songwriter, musician, and multi-instrumentalist
  - Claire Coffee, actress
  - Tom Franco, actor
  - Sarah McCoy, novelist
- April 15
  - Aida Mollencamp, cook, food writer, and television personality
  - Damien Dante Wayans, actor, screenwriter, producer, and director
- April 16
  - Jake Andrews, blues rock guitarist and singer/songwriter
  - Paul London, wrestler
- April 17
  - Nicholas D'Agosto, actor
  - Brenda Villa, water polo player
- April 18
  - Justin Amash, politician
  - Scott Belsky, entrepreneur, author, early-stage investor, and co-creator of Behance
- April 19
  - Jeremy Bridges, football player
  - Alexis Thorpe, actress
- April 20
  - Brian Allen, football player
  - Chris Duffy, baseball player
- April 21
  - Steve Bellisari, football player
  - Tony Romo, football player
- April 22
  - Brad Banks, football player
  - Malcolm Barrett, actor
  - Courtney Friel, news anchor and reporter
- April 23
  - Jacob Bossman, politician
  - Griffon Ramsey, artist
- April 24
  - Katherine Bailess, actress, singer, and dancer
  - Danielle Borgman, soccer player
  - Jamie Broadnax, film critic, podcaster, and writer
  - Danny Gokey, 3rd place finalist on American Idol (season 8)
  - Reagan Gomez-Preston, actress and voice actress
  - Gavin Hickie, Irish-born rugby player and coach
  - Austin Nichols, actor
- April 25
  - Geoff Bennett, journalist
  - Ruben Kihuen, politician
- April 26
  - Jordana Brewster, actress and model
  - Amin Joseph, actor
  - Channing Tatum, actor, producer, and dancer
- April 28
  - Illmind, record producer, songwriter, and educator
  - Josh Howard, basketball player
- April 29
  - Jason Anderson, football player
  - Nathan Burton, football coach
- April 30
  - Jon Awe, ice hockey player
  - Brook Billings, volleyball player

=== May ===
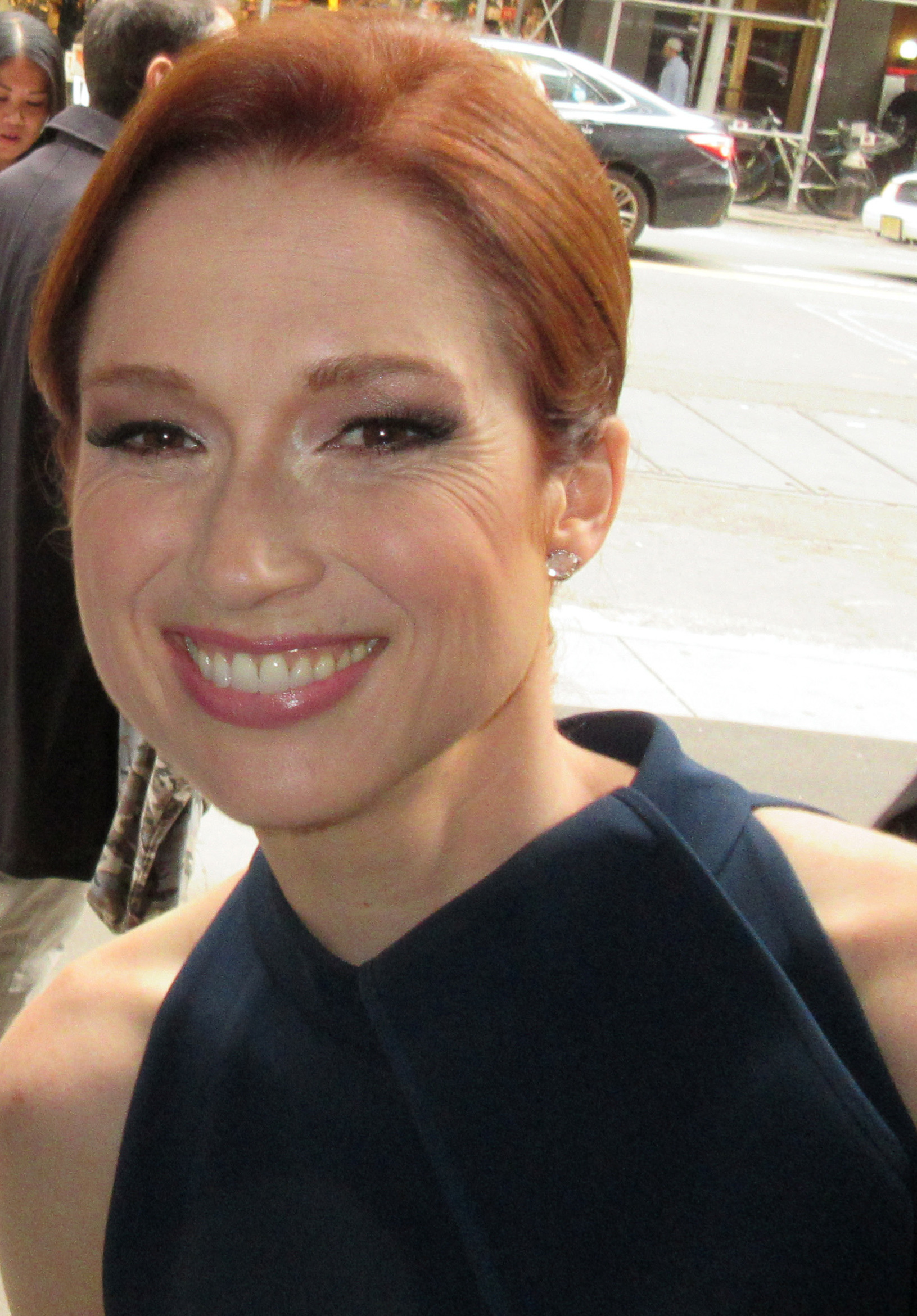
Ellie Kemper

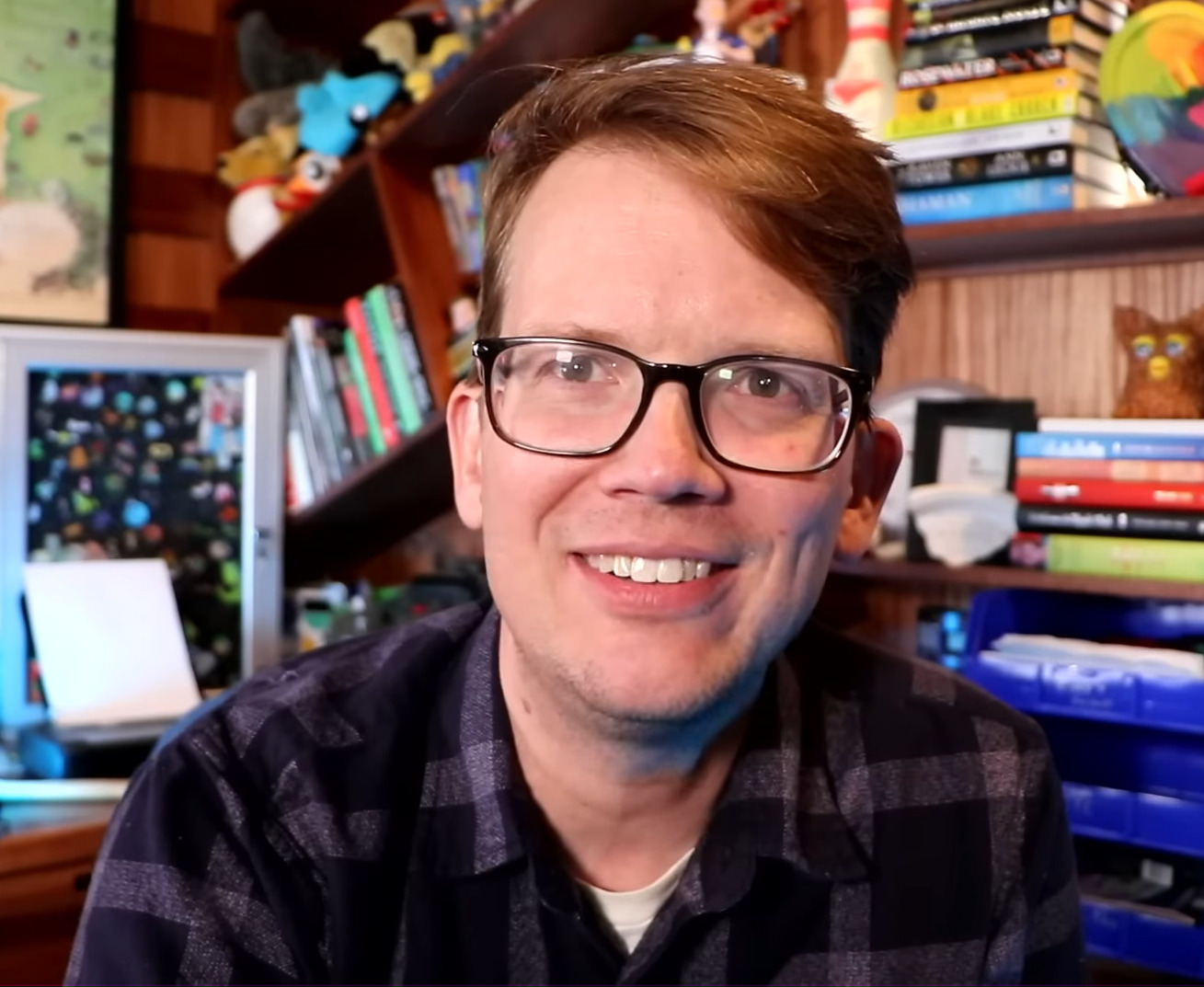
Hank Green

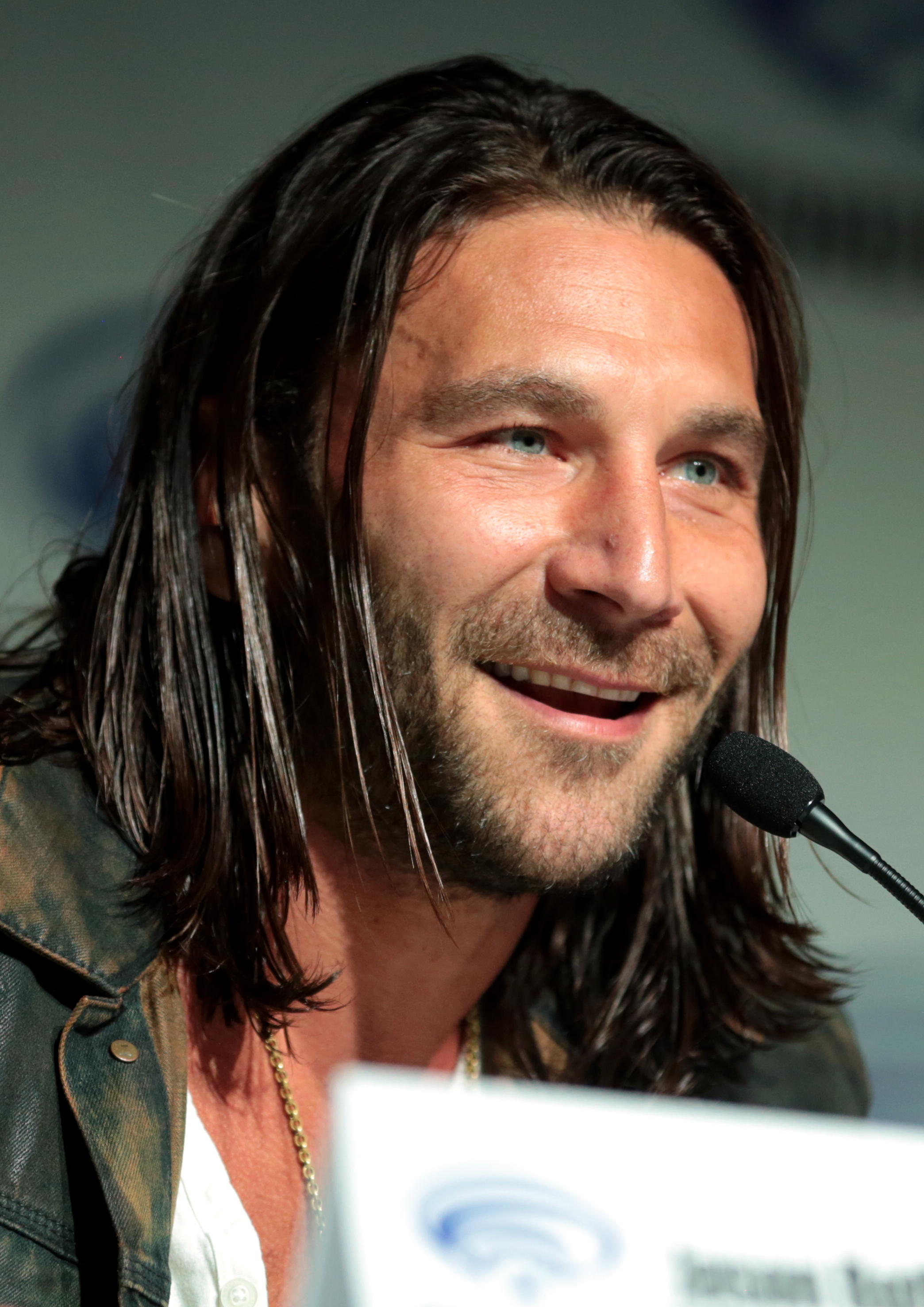
Zach McGowan

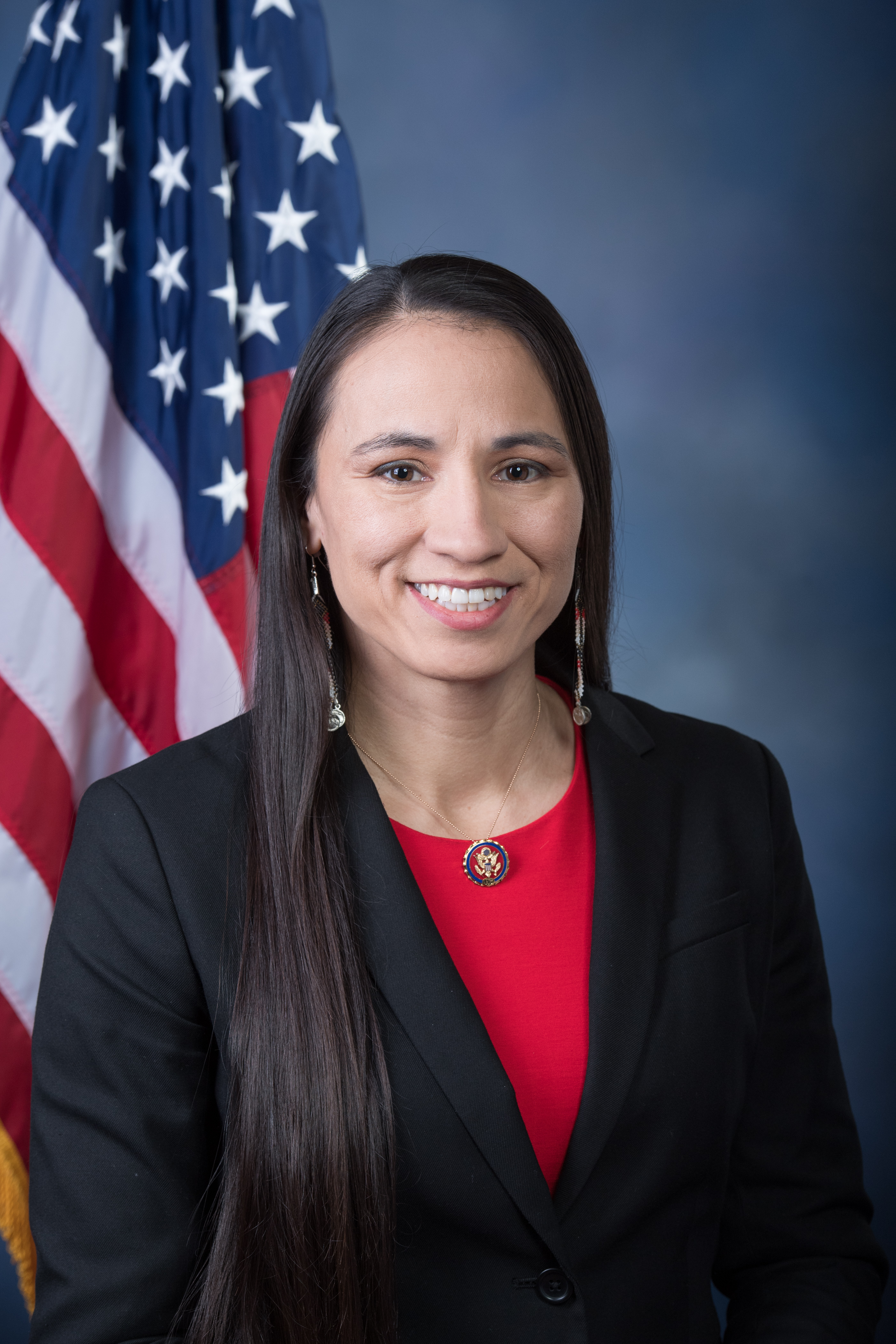
Sharice Davids

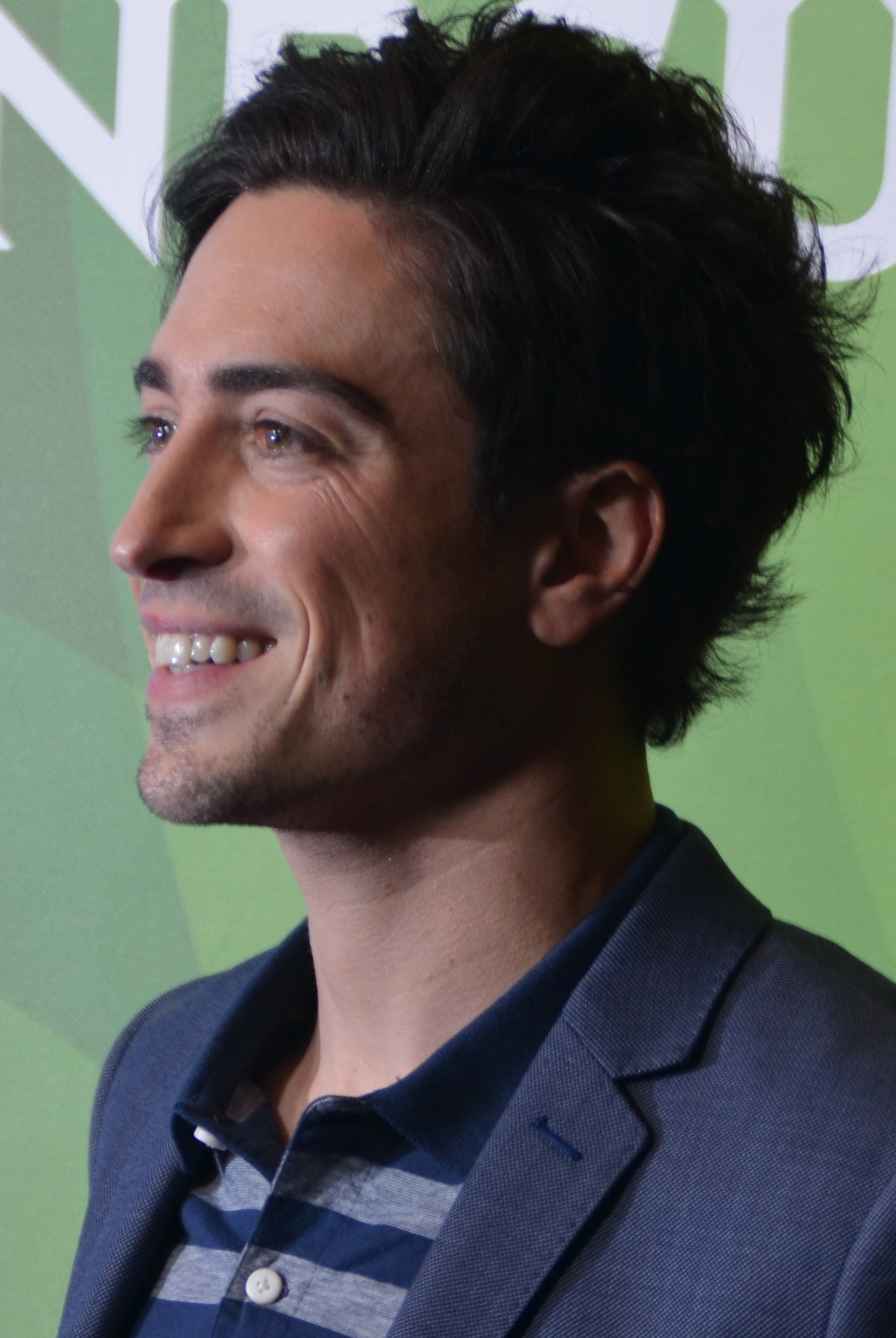
Ben Feldman

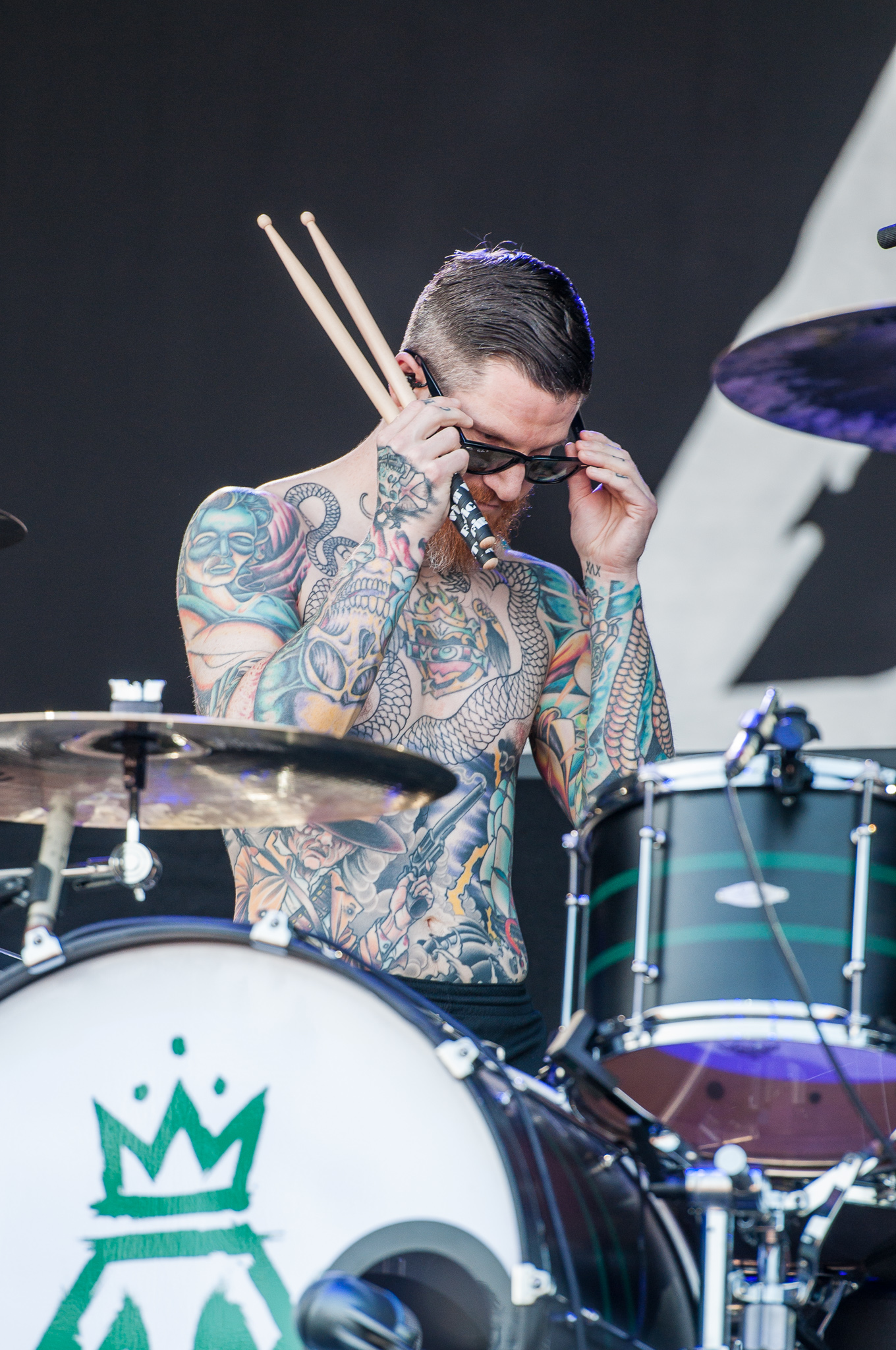
Andy Hurley

- May 1 – Jay Reatard, musician (d. 2010)
- May 2
  - Chris Boyles, decathlete
  - Ellie Kemper, actress and comedian
- May 3
  - Benjamin Ritchie, convicted murderer (d. 2025)
  - Marcel Vigneron, chef
- May 4 – Greg Brown, baseball coach
- May 5
  - Sandra Beasley, poet and writer
  - Chad Bentz, baseball player
  - Lara Berman, Israeli-born on-air news correspondent, journalist, actress, entrepreneur, and pro-Israel activist
  - Fasil Bizuneh, German-born long-distance runner
  - Hank Green, entrepreneur, musician, educator, producer and vlogger
  - Zach McGowan, actor
  - Ike Taylor, football player
- May 6
  - Brooke Bennett, Olympic swimmer
  - Colt Cabana, wrestler
  - Taebin, singer and TV host
- May 7
  - Saeed Abedini, Iranian-born pastor
  - Faith Winter, politician (d. 2025)
- May 9 – Sarah Sokolovic, actress
- May 10 – Craig Brazell, baseball player
- May 11
  - Kulap Vilaysack, actress, comedian and Writer
- May 12
  - Keith Bhonapha, football player and coach
  - Keith Bogans, basketball player
- May 14
  - Sarah Maestas Barnes, lawyer and politician
  - James Bowman, lead guitarist and vocalist for Against Me!
- May 15
  - Erica Bartolina, Olympic pole vaulter
  - Josh Beckett, baseball player
  - Cheri Blauwet, physician and Paralympic wheelchair racer
- May 17
  - Jerome Beasley, basketball player
  - Dallas Taylor, singer and frontman for Maylene and the Sons of Disaster
- May 18
  - Barrett Baber, country, alternative, and rock musician
  - Matt Long, actor
- May 19
  - Mark Brown, football player
  - Drew Fuller, actor and model
- May 20 – Chris Bagley, soccer player
- May 22 – Sharice Davids, politician, lawyer and mixed martial artist
- May 23
  - Nate Boulton, politician
  - Gary Brackett, football player
  - Lane Garrison, actor
  - Chris Gethard, actor, comedian, and writer
- May 24
  - Jason Babin, football player
  - Owen Benjamin, internet personality, stand-up comedian, and actor
- May 26 – Sean Barker, baseball player
- May 27
  - Ben Feldman, actor
  - Michael Steger, actor
- May 28
  - Kadar Brock, casualist artist
  - Josh Brooks, university sports administrator
- May 29 – Cha-seung Baek, South Korean-born baseball player
- May 30
  - Jenna Lee, journalist and news anchor
  - Remy Ma, rapper
- May 31 – Andy Hurley, drummer of Fall Out Boy

=== June ===
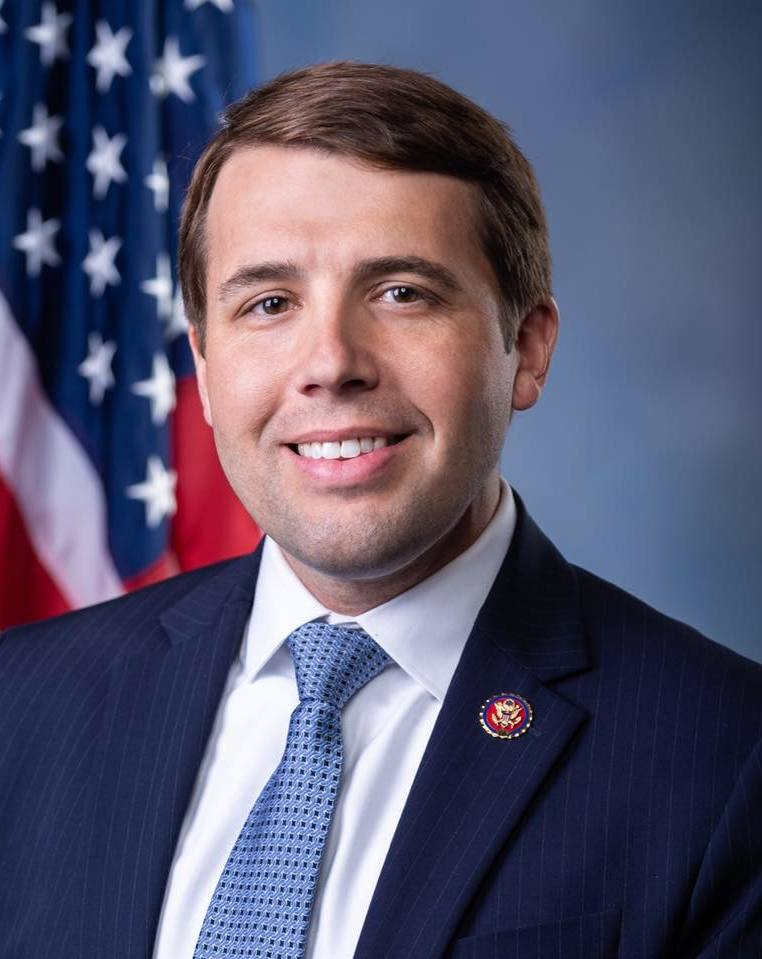
Chris Pappas

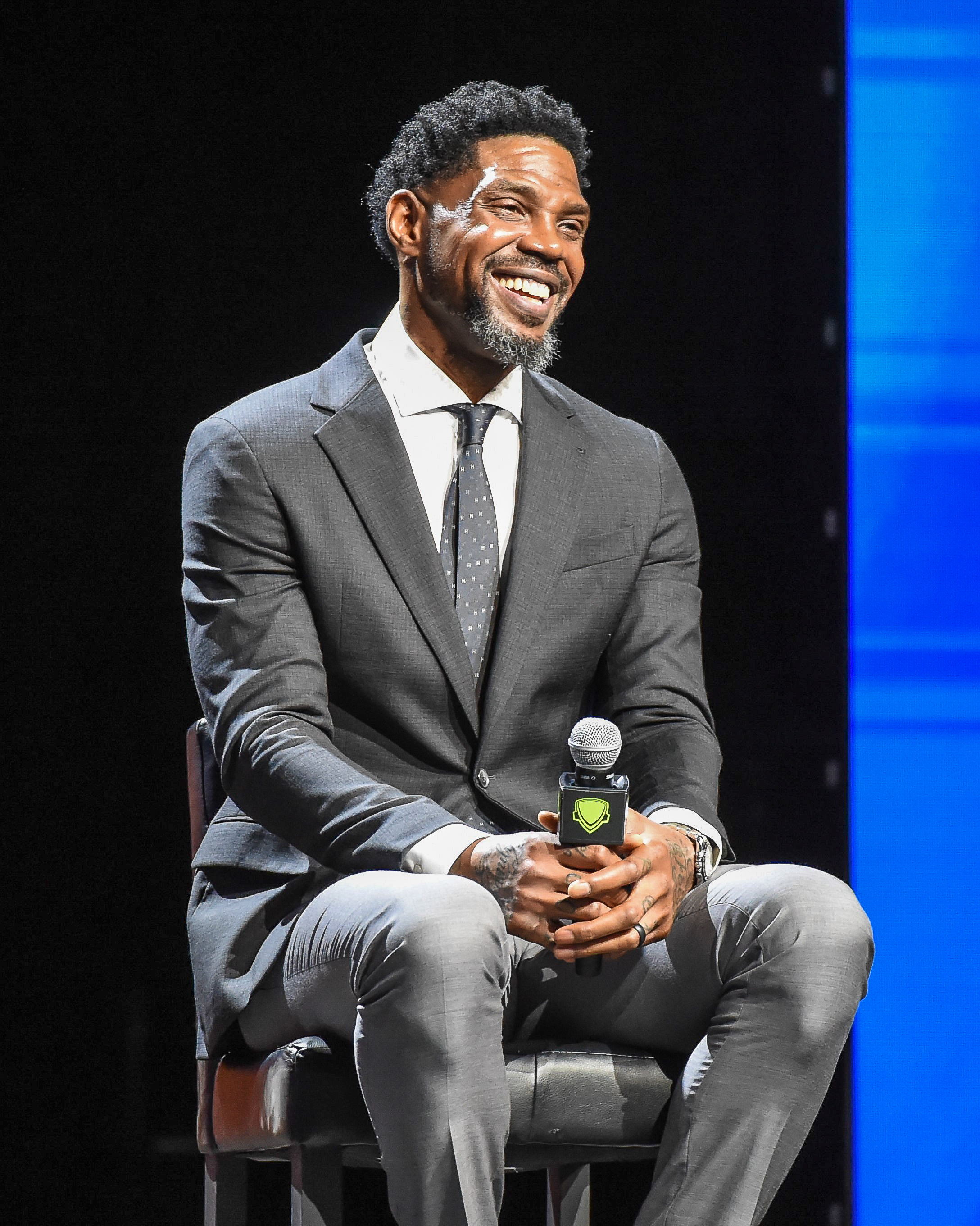
Udonis Haslem

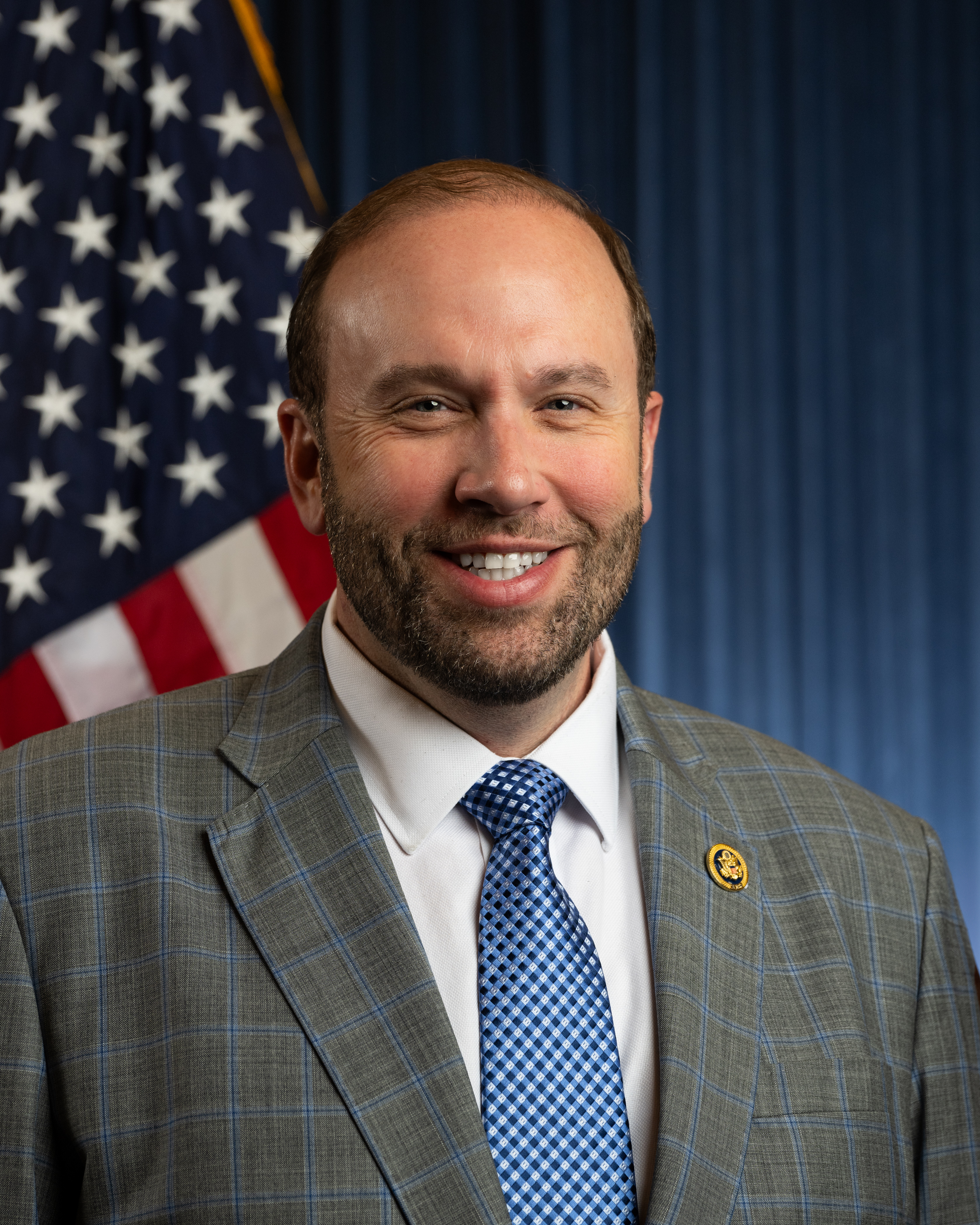
Jason Smith

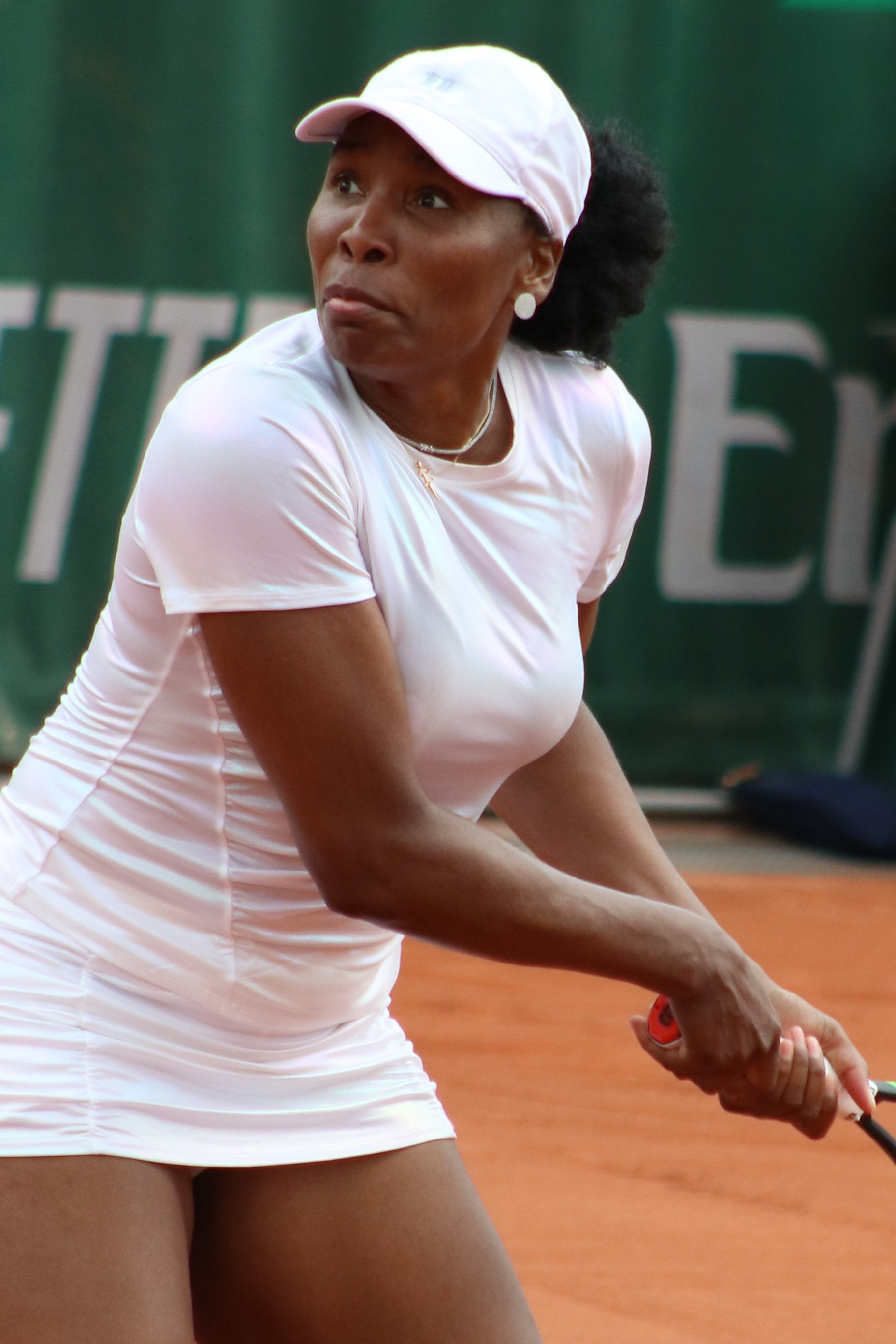
Venus Williams

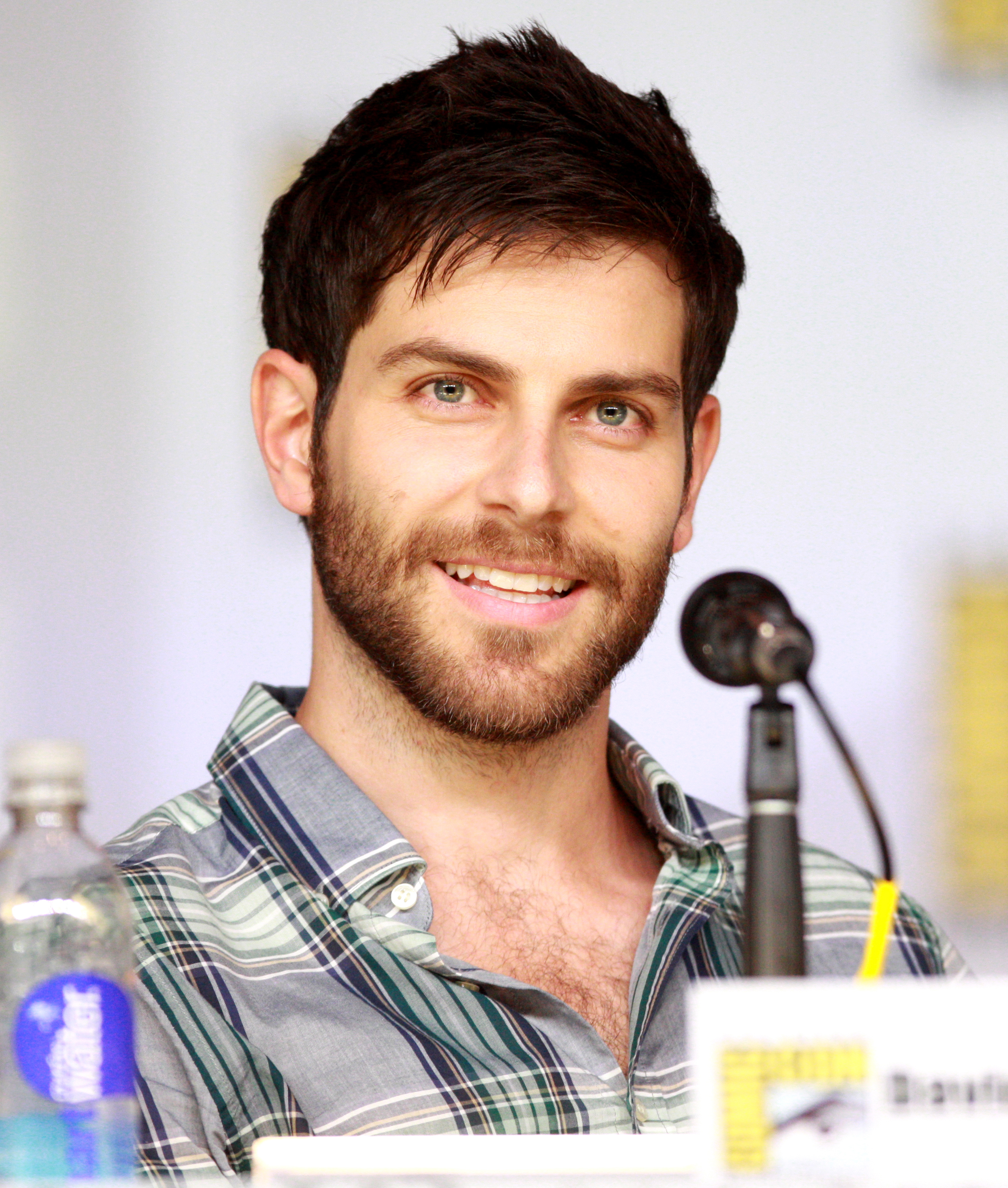
David Giuntoli

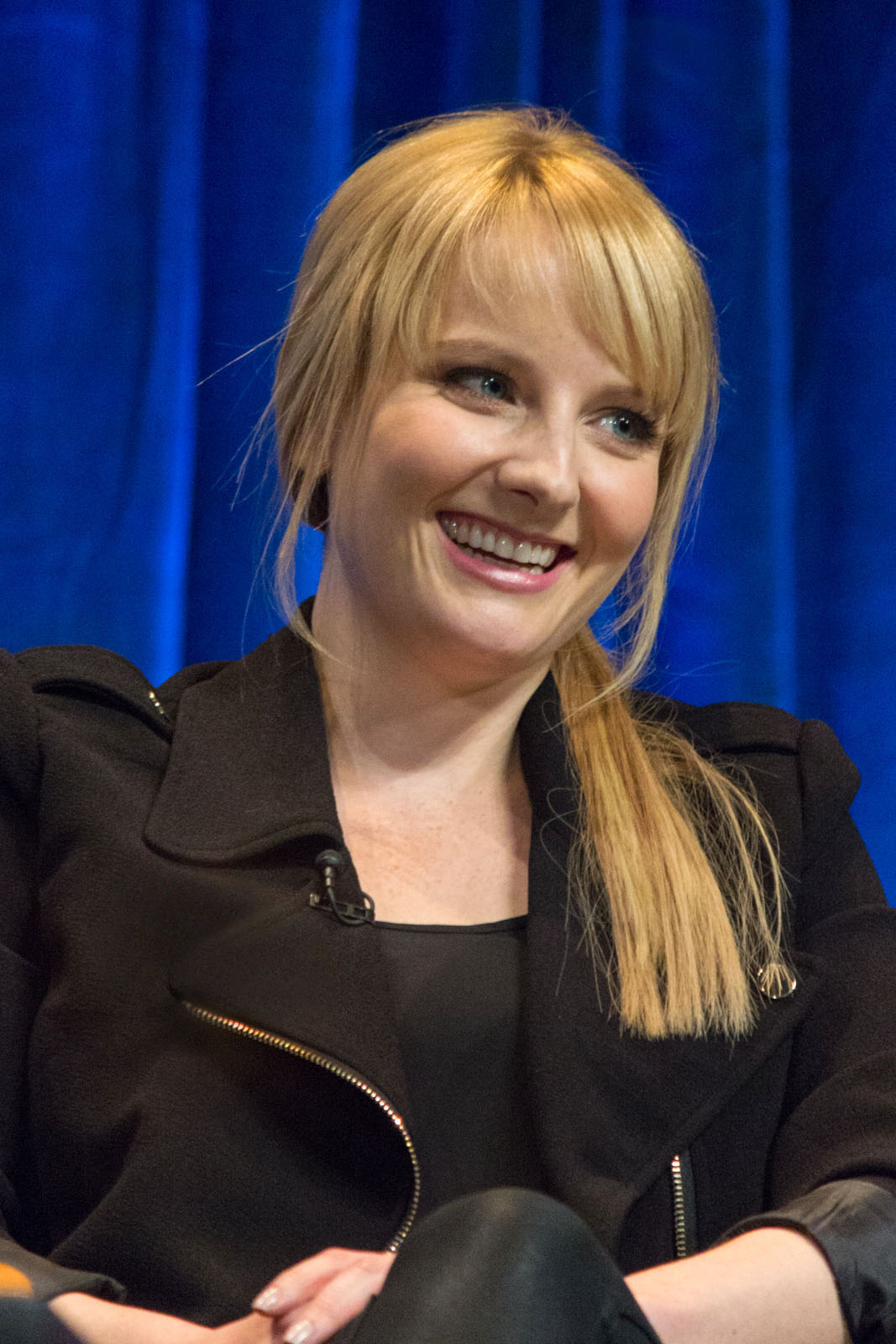
Melissa Rauch

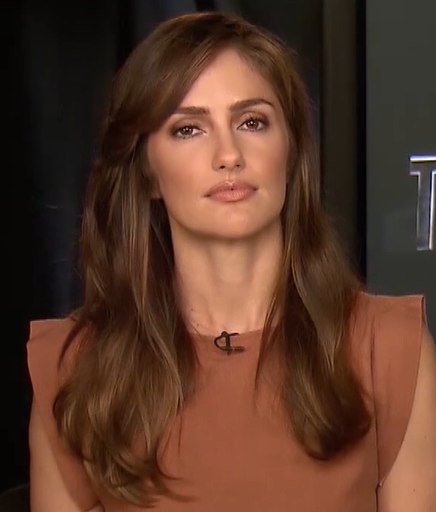
Minka Kelly

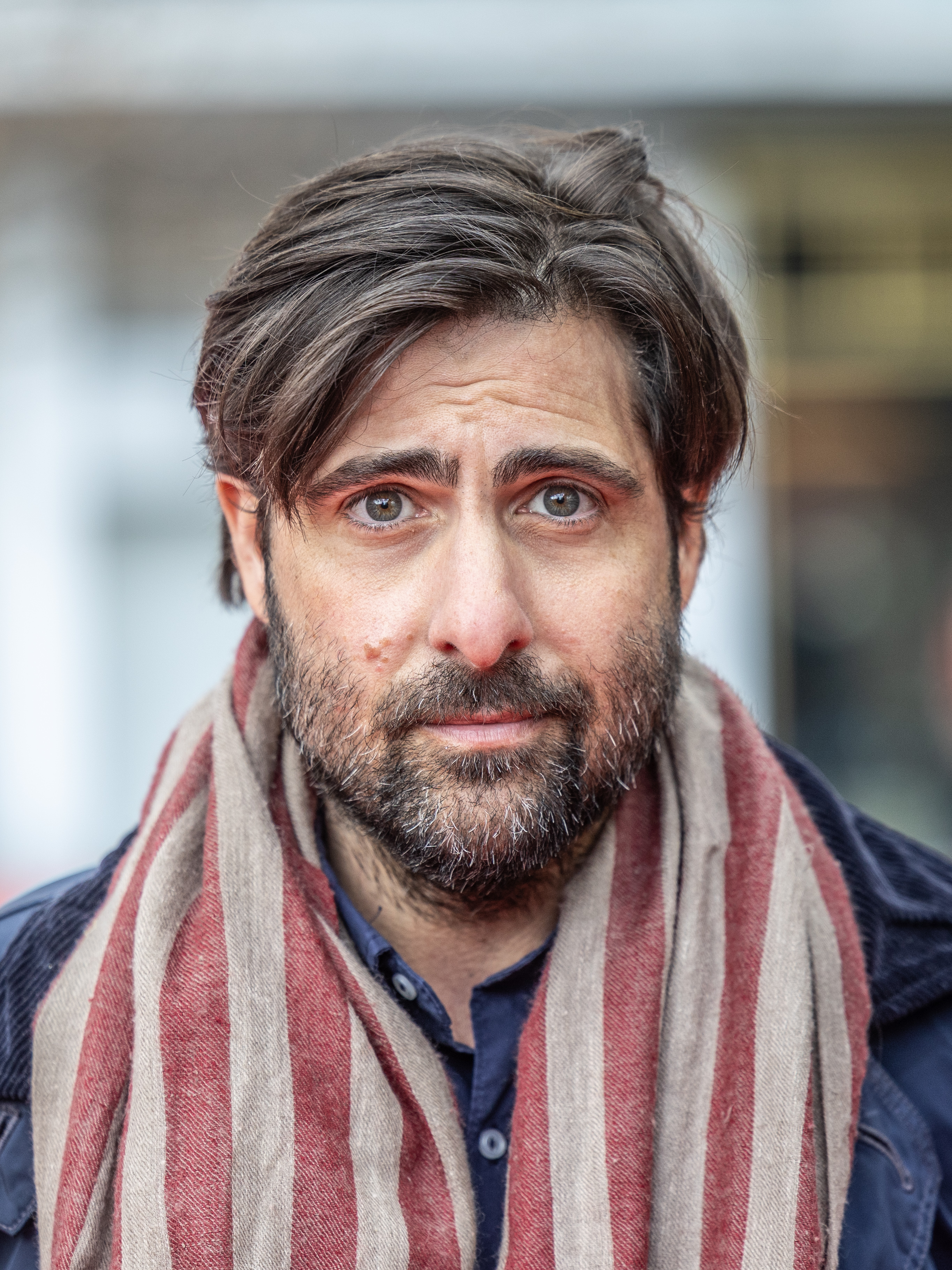
Jason Schwartzman

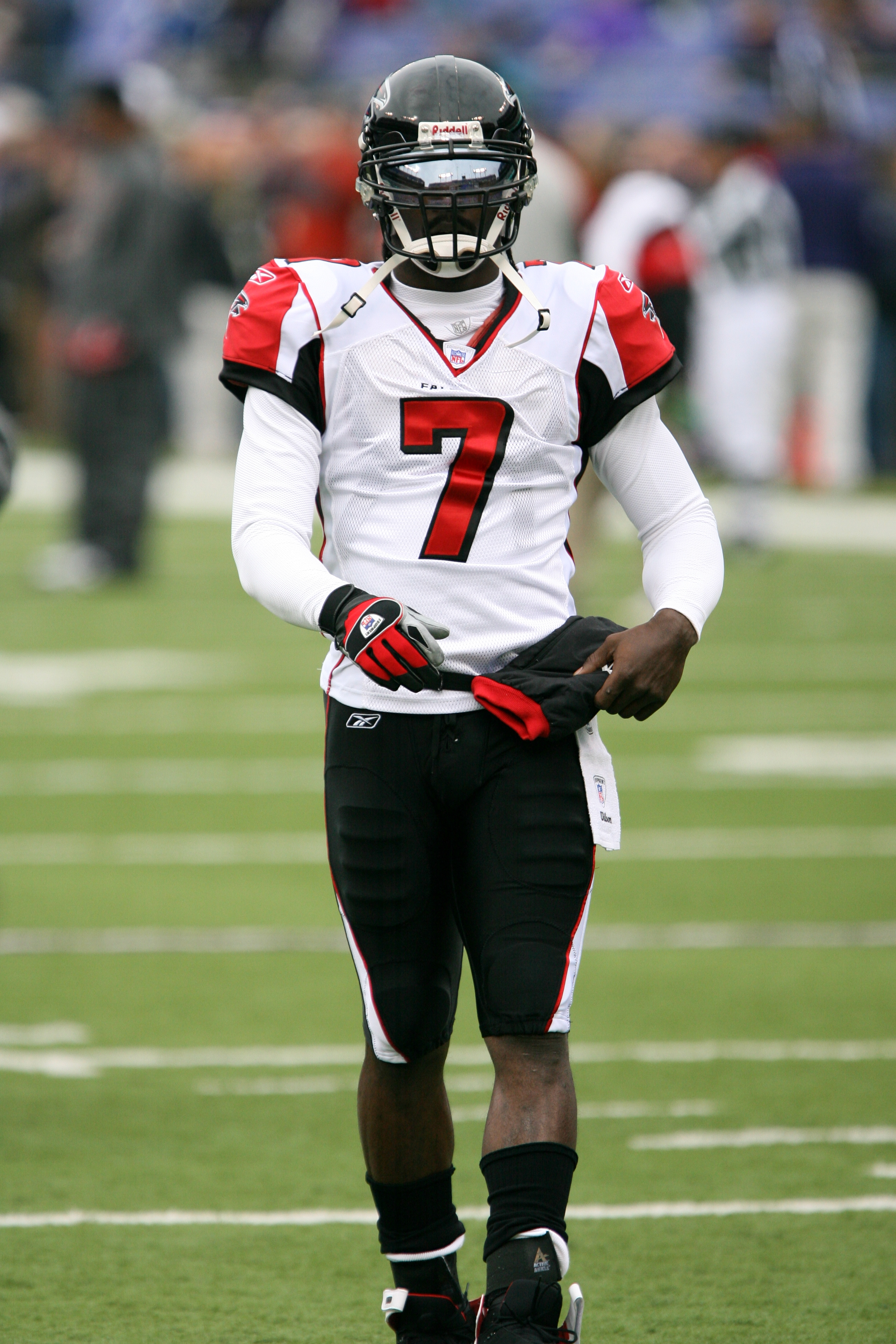
Michael Vick

- June 1
  - Spencer Ackerman, journalist and writer
  - Damien Fahey, MTV VJ, television host and drummer
  - Jason Woliner, director, writer, and actor
- June 2 – Daniel Breaker, actor and comedian
- June 3 – The Blade, wrestler
- June 4
  - Elizabeth Axtman, artist
  - Bukkcity, Australian-born rapper
  - Chris Pappas, politician
- June 5
  - Jykine Bradley, American-born Canadian football player
  - Ryan Devlin, actor and television host
- June 6
  - Lauren Anderson, model
  - Matt Belisle, baseball player
  - Pete Hegseth, television host and author
  - Peter Mosely, rock musician
- June 7
  - Nick Bobeck, football player and coach
  - Ed Moses, Olympic swimmer and reality contestant
- June 8 – Erin Mendenhall, politician, mayor of Salt Lake City, Utah (2020–present)
- June 9
  - David Oliver Cohen, writer, actor and entrepreneur
  - James DeBello, actor
  - Udonis Haslem, basketball player
- June 10
  - Jeff Bennett, baseball player
  - Jessica DiCicco, actress and voice actress
- June 11
  - Jennifer L. Armentrout, writer
  - Lisa Donovan. YouTuber
- June 12
  - Brett Blizzard, basketball player
  - Diem Brown, reality star (d. 2014)
  - Larry Foote, American football player
- June 15
  - Willie Allen, stock car racing driver
  - Christopher Castile, actor
  - Shanelle Jackson, politician
  - Cara Zavaleta, television personality and model
- June 16
  - Brandon Armstrong, basketball player
  - Dewon Brazelton, baseball player
  - Jason Smith, politician
- June 17
  - Marion Christopher Barry, construction company owner (d. 2016)
  - Jeph Jacques, webcomic writer
  - Venus Williams, tennis player
- June 18
  - Anthony Adams, television host, actor, comedian, and football player
  - David Giuntoli, Actor
- June 19
  - Neil Brown Jr., actor
  - Teddy Dunn, Australian-born actor
  - Jason White, football player
- June 20
  - Apollo Brown, hip hop musician and record producer
- June 21
  - Scottie Nell Hughes, journalist, news anchor, and political commentator
  - Richard Jefferson, basketball player
- June 22
  - Davy Arnaud, soccer player and coach
  - Brian Bowles, mixed martial artist
  - Blake Moore, politician
- June 23
  - Gabriel Bello, smooth jazz saxophonist, vocalist, and keyboardist
  - Blair Herter, television personality
  - Melissa Rauch, actress and comedian
- June 24
  - Doug Bernier, baseball player
  - Minka Kelly, actress
  - Amirah Vann, actress
- June 25 – Shannon Lucio, actress
- June 26
  - Casey DeSantis, First Lady of Florida, wife of Ron DeSantis
  - Jason Schwartzman, actor and musician
  - Michael Vick, football player
- June 28 – Johntá Austin, singer/songwriter, arranger, producer, vocalist, and rapper
- June 29
  - Jeneda Benally, bassist and vocalist for Blackfire
  - Martin Truex Jr., race car driver
- June 30 – Gary Buchanan, basketball player

=== July ===
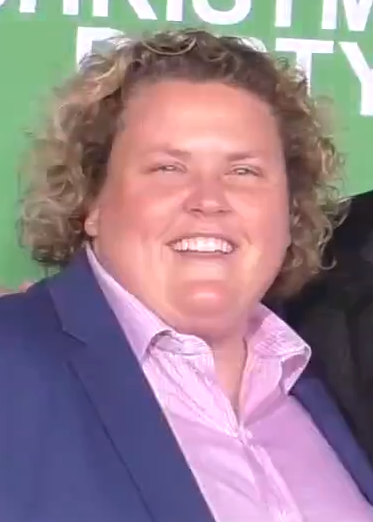
Fortune Feimster

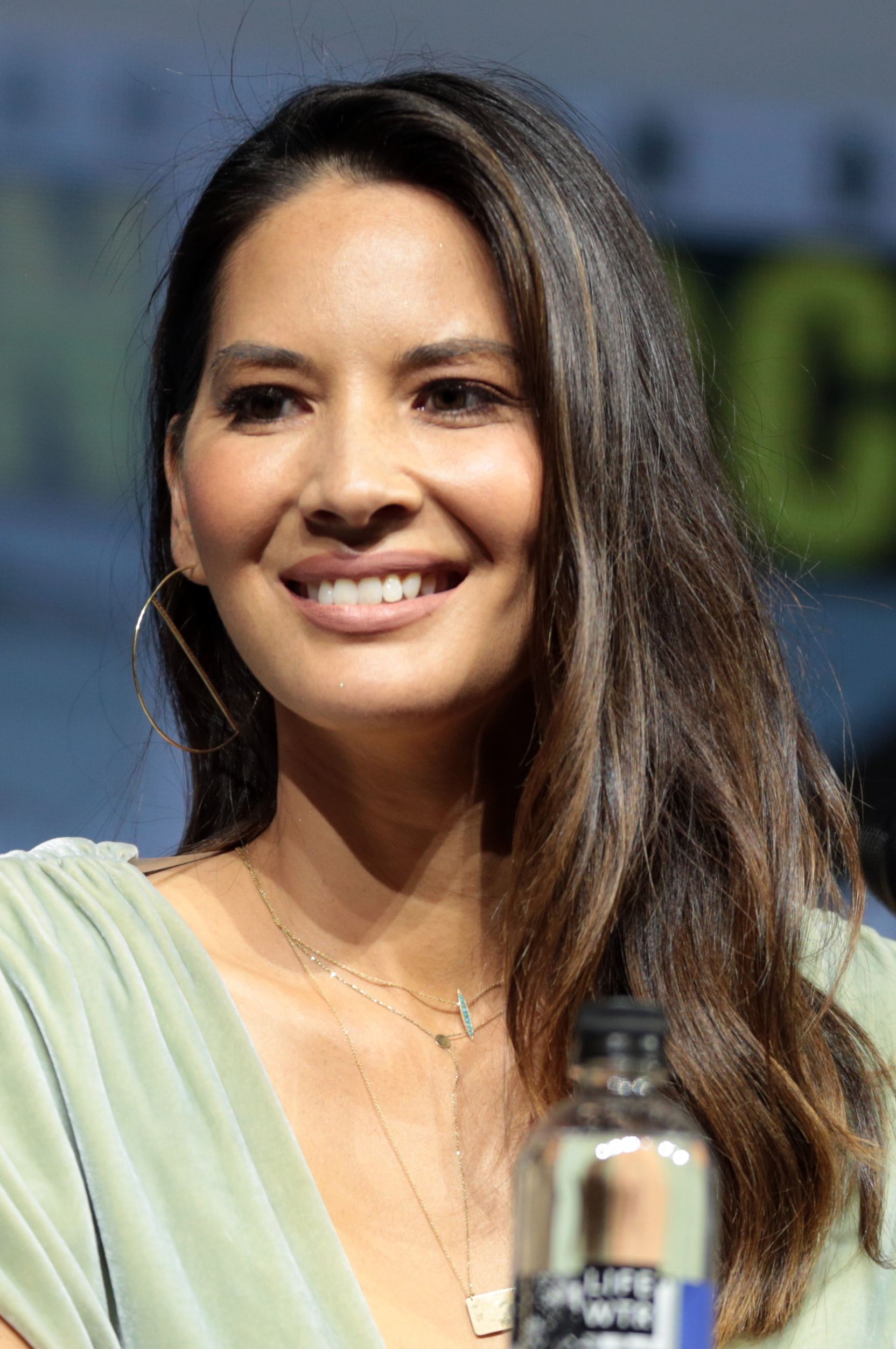
Olivia Munn

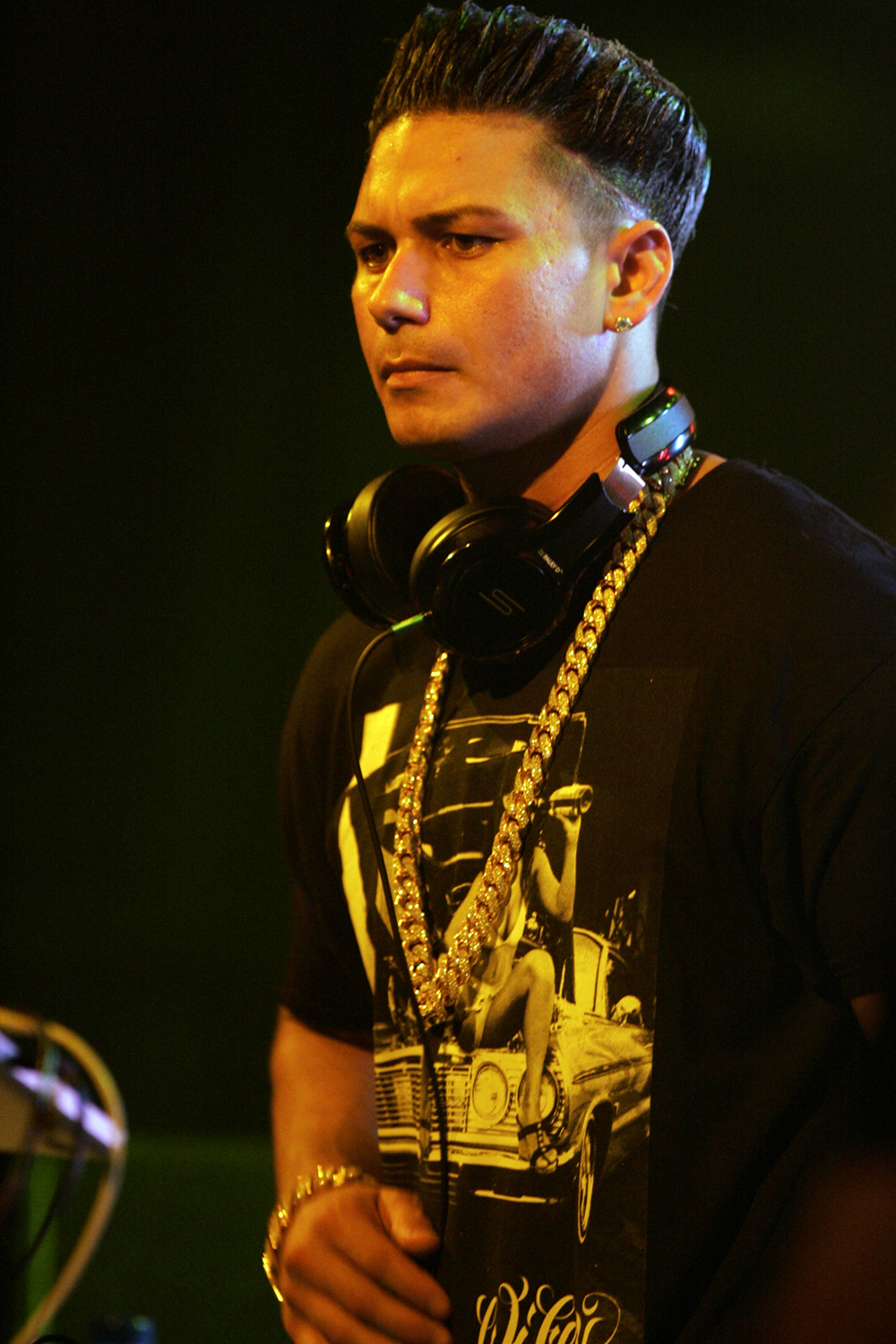
Pauly D

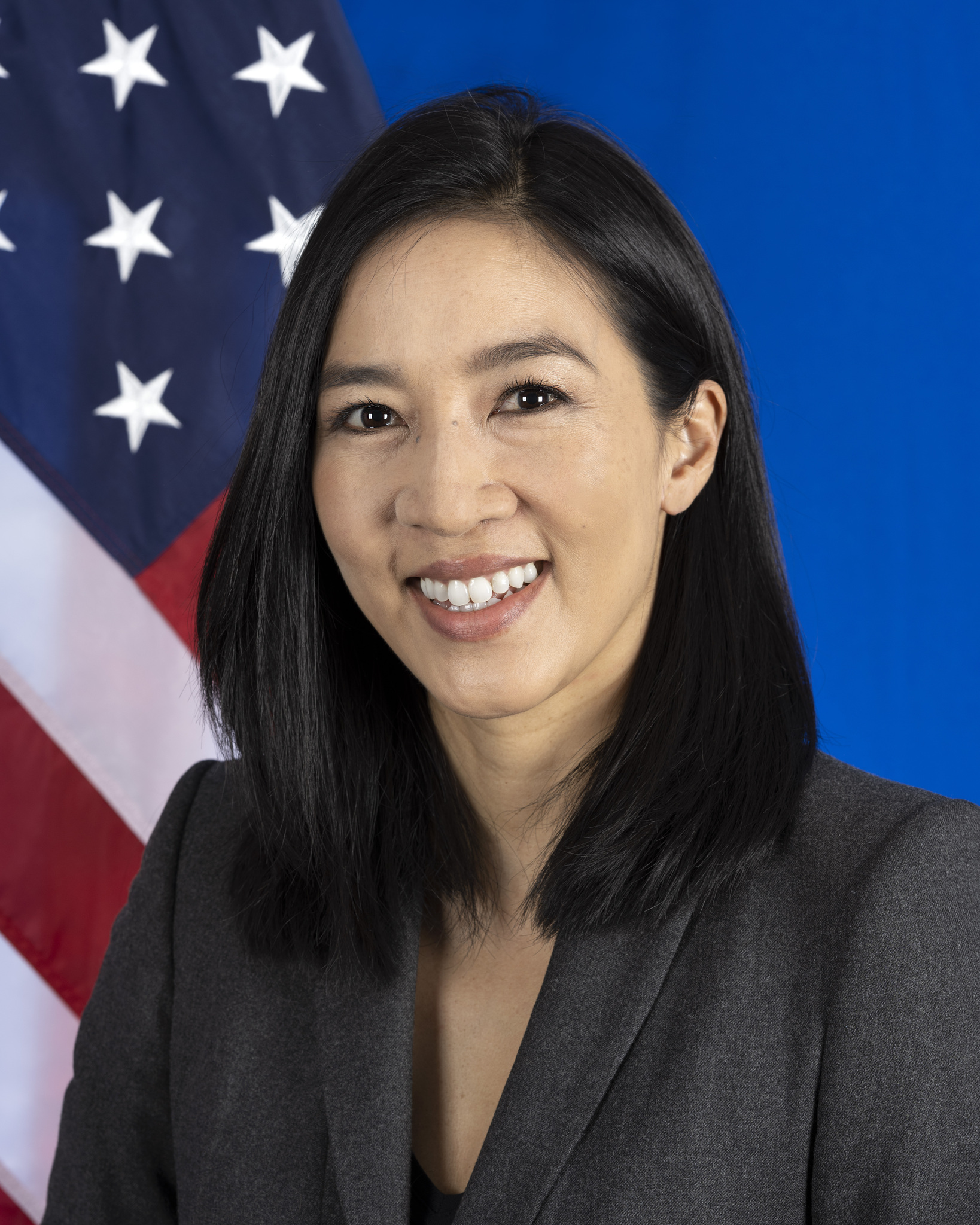
Michelle Kwan

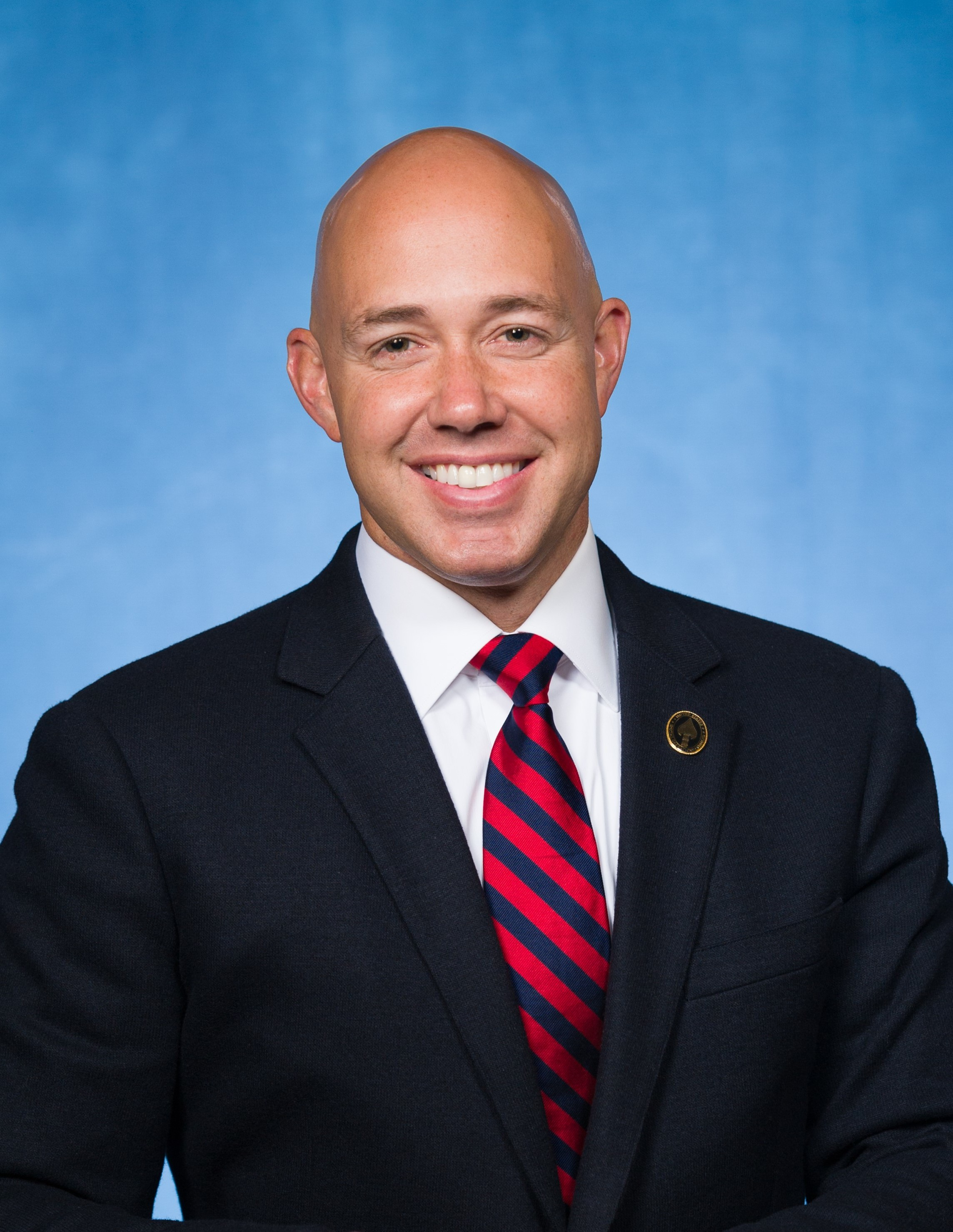
Brian Mast

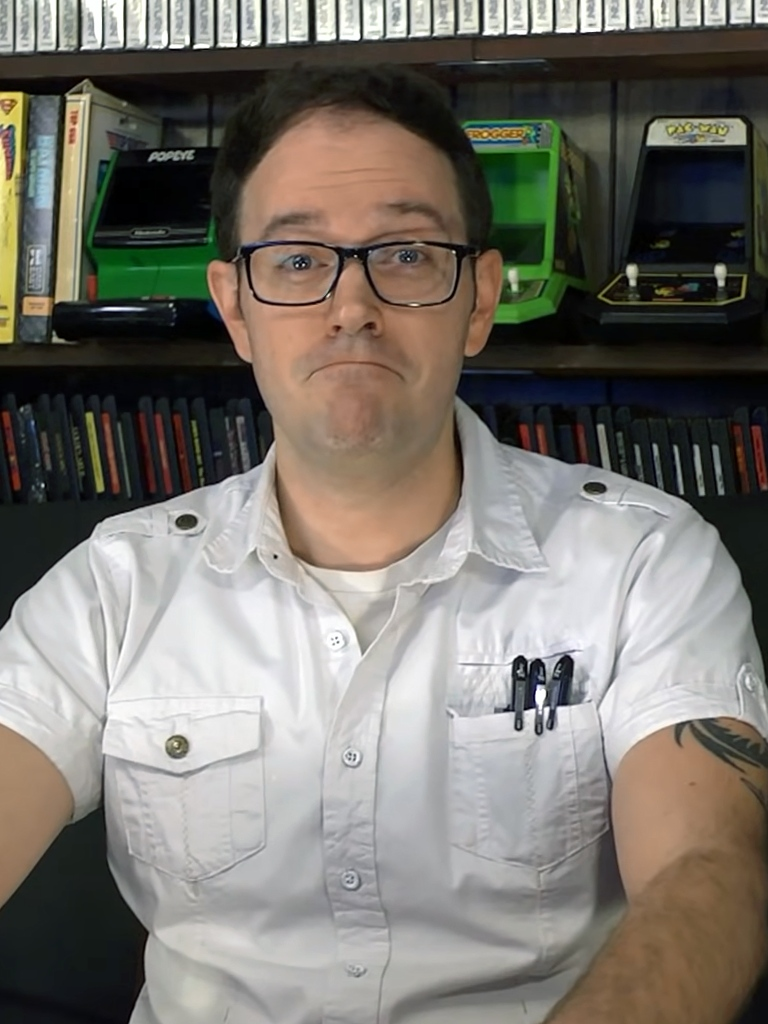
Angry Video Game Nerd

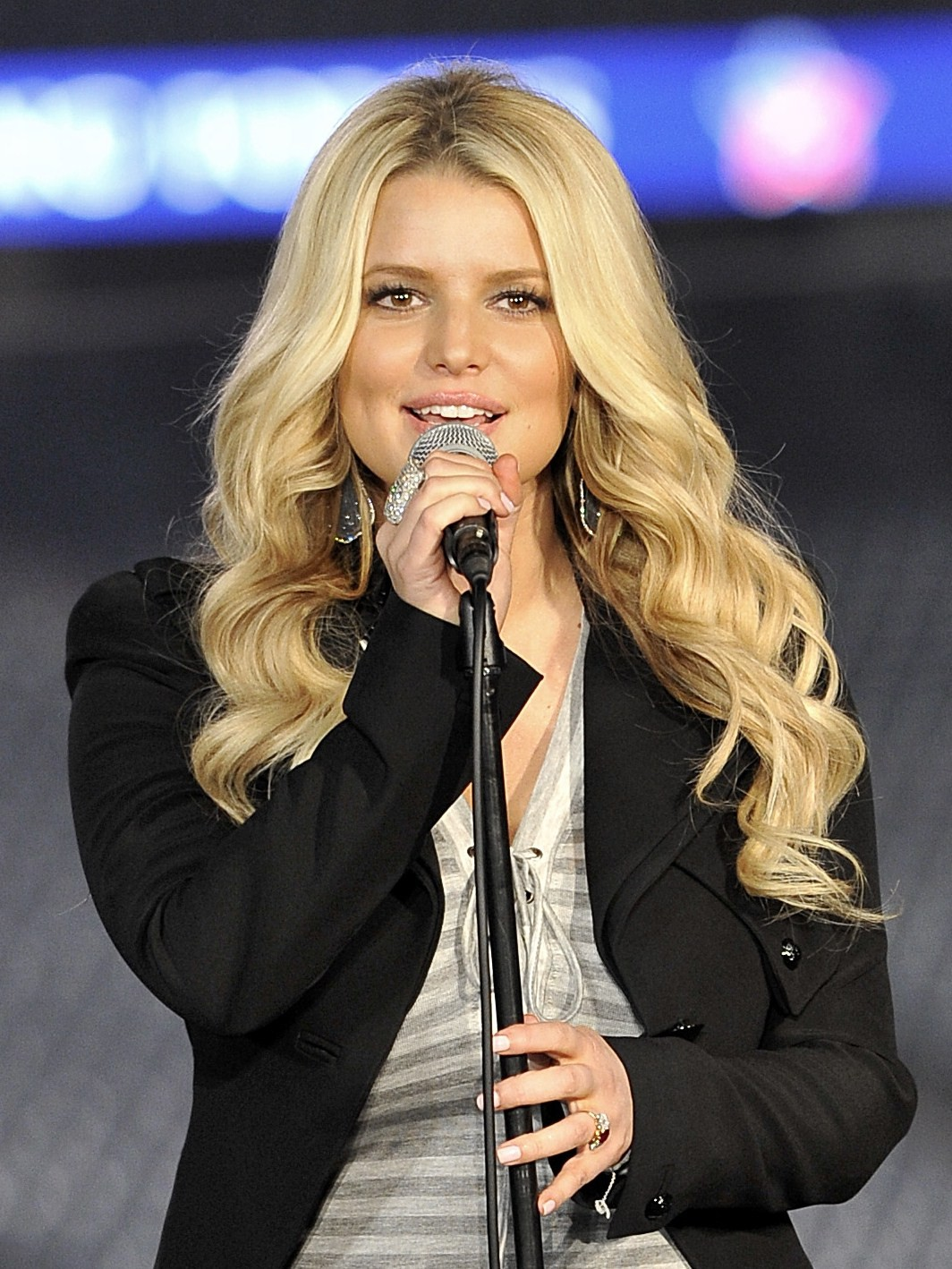
Jessica Simpson

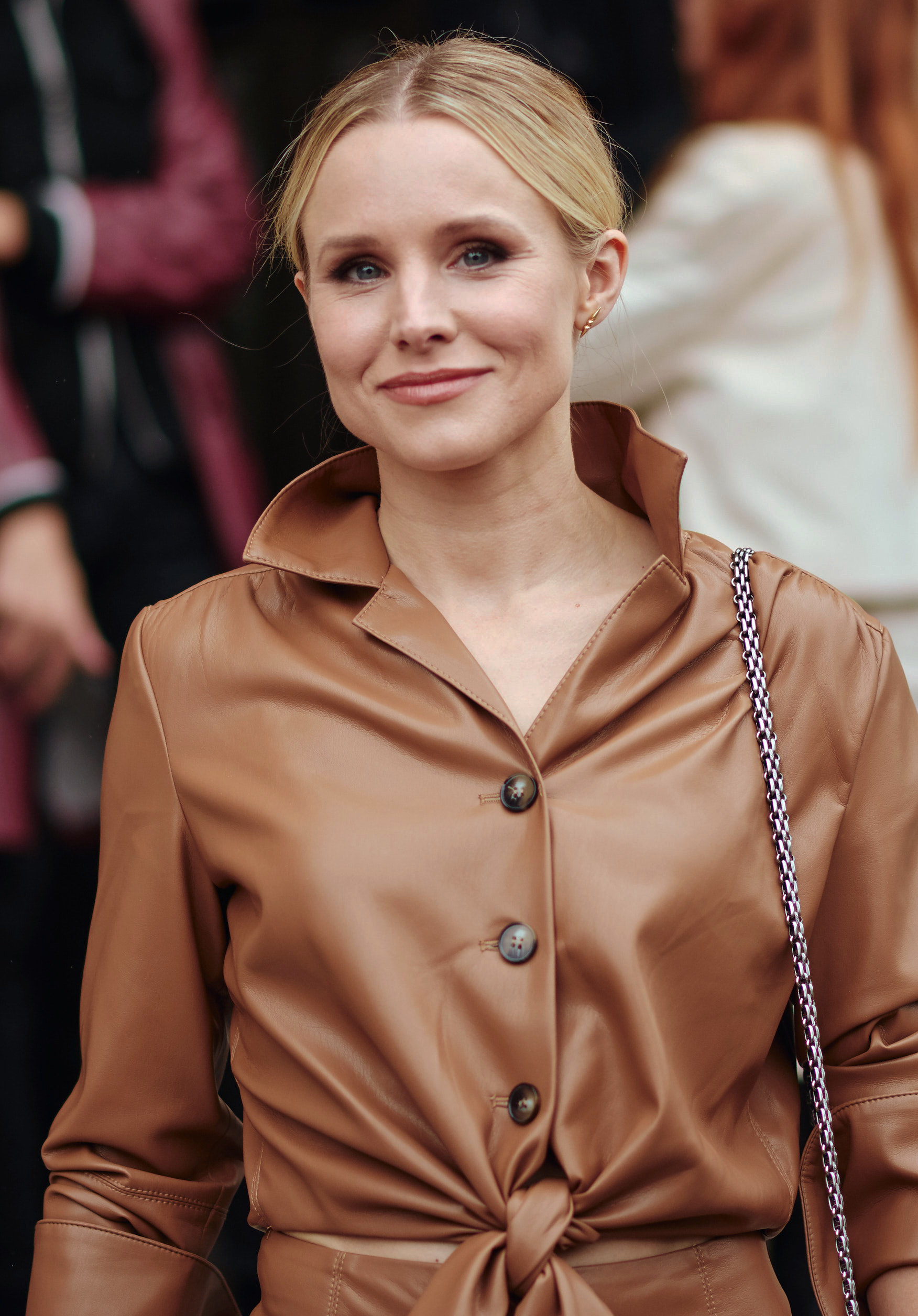
Kristen Bell

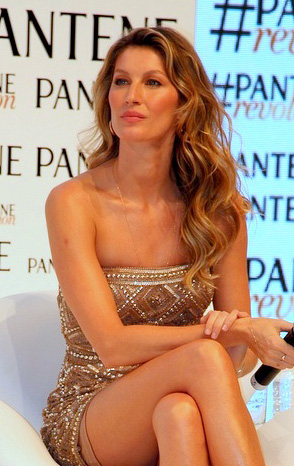
Gisele Bündchen

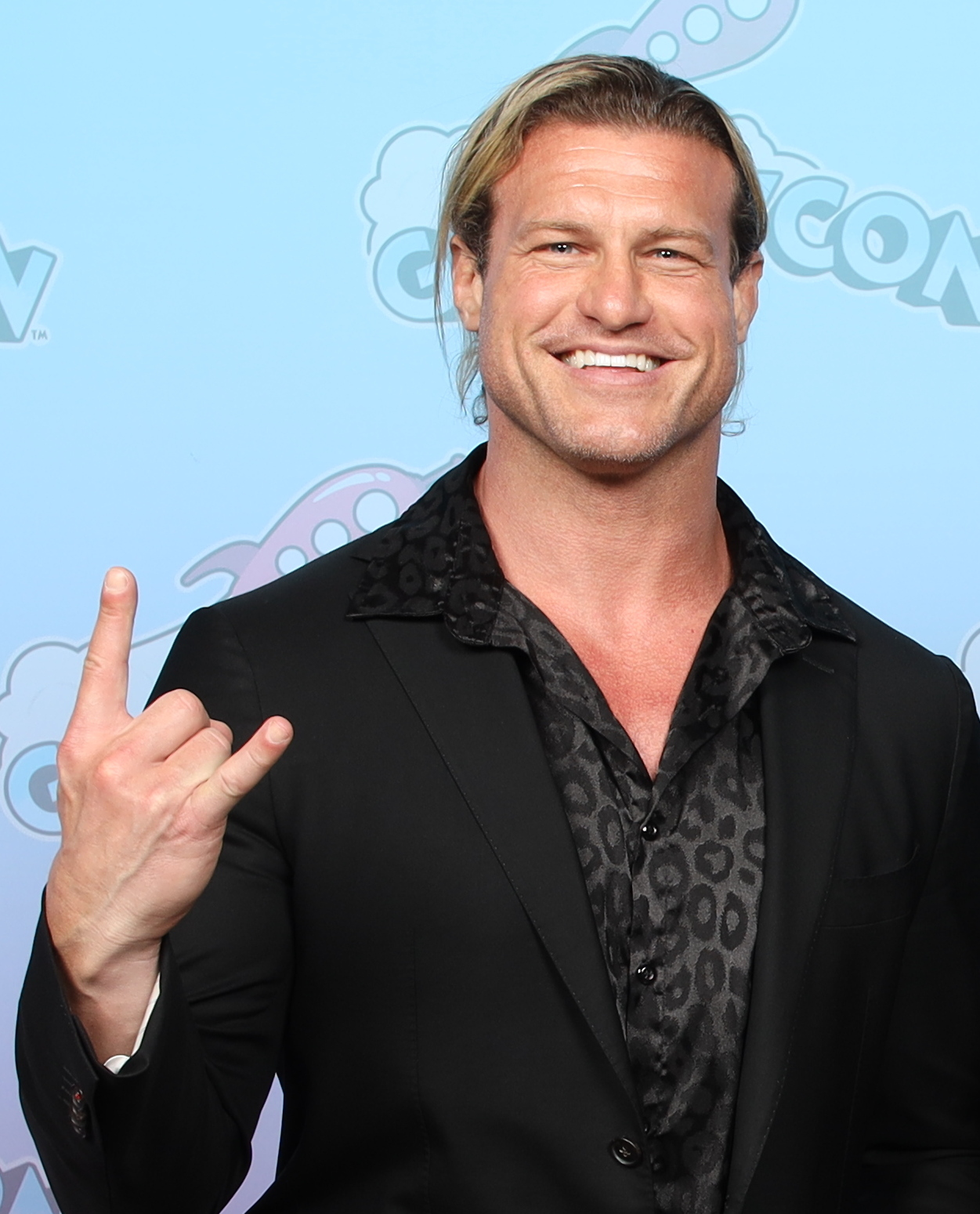
Dolph Ziggler

- July 1
  - Alex Blagg, writer, comedian, and producer
  - Fortune Feimster, write, comedian, and actress
  - Nina Lisandrello, actress
  - Riley Moore, politician
- July 2
  - Kendrell Bell, football player
  - Nicole Briscoe, sportscaster
  - Sarah Buxton, country singer
  - Brian Drolet, actor, producer and writer
  - Nyjer Morgan, baseball player
- July 3
  - Brandon Bernard, convicted robber, kidnapper, and murderer (d. 2020)
  - Olivia Munn, actress and model
  - Trae tha Truth, hip hop artist
- July 4
  - Misty C. Bentz, astrophysicist and college professor
  - Max Elliott Slade, actor
- July 5
  - Paul "DJ Pauly D" DelVecchio, reality star
  - Mads Tolling, Danish-born violinist
  - Jason Wade, singer, guitarist, and frontman for Lifehouse
  - Charles Klapow, choreographer and dance instructor
- July 6 – DJ Babey Drew, DJ, Grammy winning record producer, actor, radio and television personality
- July 7
  - John Buck, baseball player
  - Marika Domińczyk, Polish-born actress
  - Deidre Downs, model and physician, Miss America 2005
  - Michelle Kwan, Olympic figure skater
- July 9 – Jodi Arias, convicted murderer
- July 10
  - Sally Barkow, Olympic sailor
  - Brian Mast, politician
  - Thomas Ian Nicholas, actor, singer, musician, producer, director and writer
  - Adam Petty, racing driver (died 2000)
  - James Rolfe, actor, director, and producer
  - Nick Schifrin, journalist
  - Jessica Simpson, singer
  - Bret Taylor, computer programmer and entrepreneur, co-creator of Google Maps
  - Adande Thorne, Trinidadian-American YouTuber
  - Jeremy Ray Valdez, actor and musician
- July 11
  - Jenny Trout, author
  - Justin Willman, magician, actor, entertainer, comedian, and television personality
- July 12
  - Yimon Aye, Burmese-born chemist and molecular biologist
  - Kristen Connolly, actress
- July 13
  - Corey Clark, singer
  - Cory Mills, politician
- July 14 – Damon Dayoub, actor
- July 15
  - Reggie Abercrombie, baseball player
  - Candace Brown, actress and comedian
  - Robby Brown, football coach
- July 16
  - Lindsey Berg, volleyball player
  - Chris 'CT' Tamburello, television personality
- July 17
  - Derrick Allen, basketball player
  - Ryan Miller, hockey player
- July 18
  - Kristen Bell, actress
  - David Blu, American–born Israeli basketball player
  - Rufus Brown, football player
  - Akie Kotabe, actor
- July 19
  - Adam Muto, writer, director and storyboard artist
  - Mark Webber, actor
- July 20
  - Ken Appledorn, actor
  - Seth Flynn Barkan, poet and journalist
  - Gisele Bündchen, Brazilian-born fashion model
- July 21
  - Justin Griffith, football player
  - CC Sabathia, baseball player
- July 22 – Rick Brattin, politician
- July 23
  - Scott Buete, soccer player
  - Josh Bush, football player
- July 24 – Joel Stroetzel, guitarist for Killswitch Engage
- July 25 – Erik Bickerstaff, football player
- July 26 – Jason Botts, baseball player
- July 27
  - David Alvarez, politician
  - Jessi Combs, racer, television personality, and metal fabricator (d. 2019)
  - Dolph Ziggler, wrestler
- July 28
  - Mike Alvarado, boxer
  - Dante Brown, football player
  - Stephen Christian, singer/songwriter
  - Anthony Weaver, football player
- July 29
  - Ben Koller, drummer
  - Rachel Miner, actress
- July 30
  - Seth Avett, folk singer and founding member of The Avett Brothers
  - Roberto Benitez, boxer

=== August ===
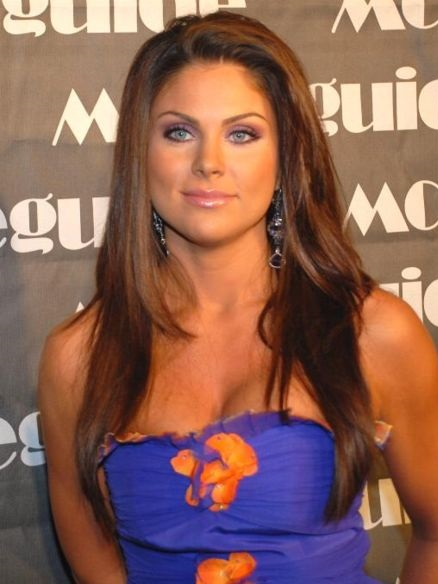
Nadia Bjorlin

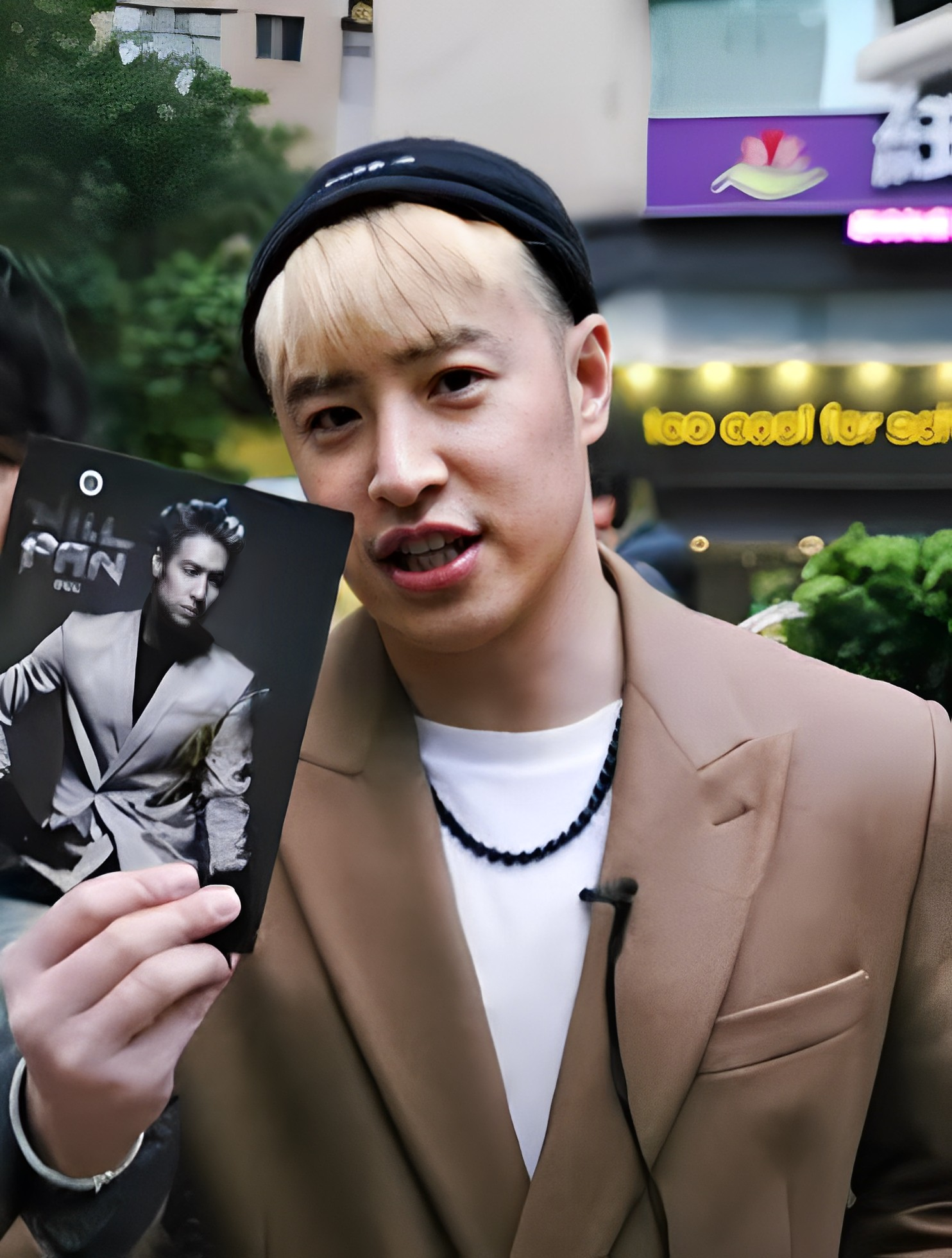
Will Pan

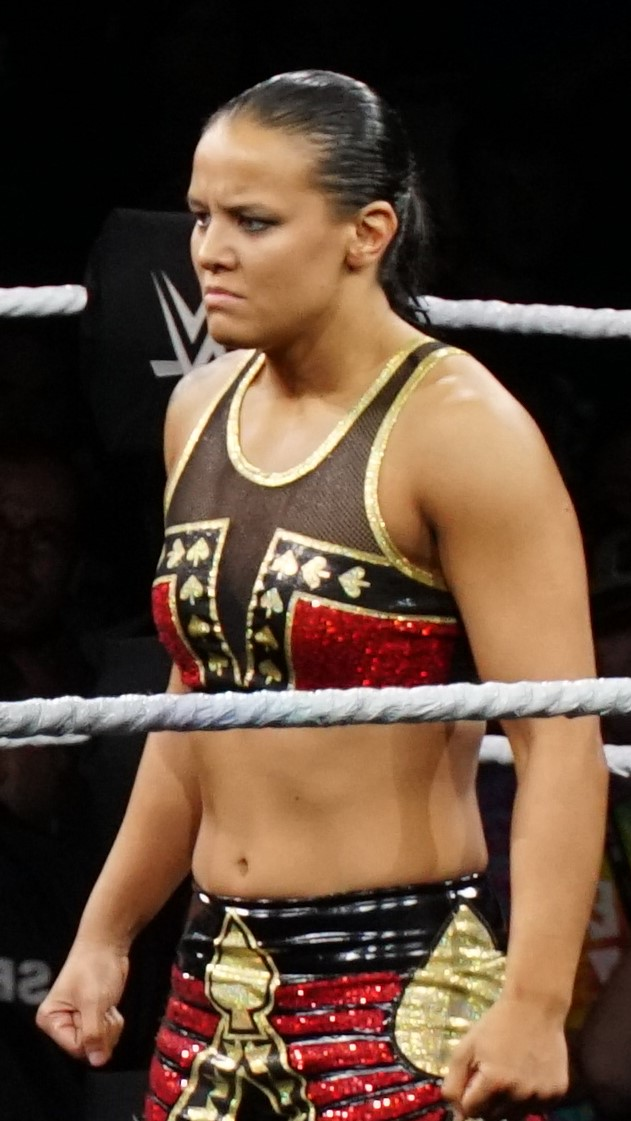
Shayna Baszler

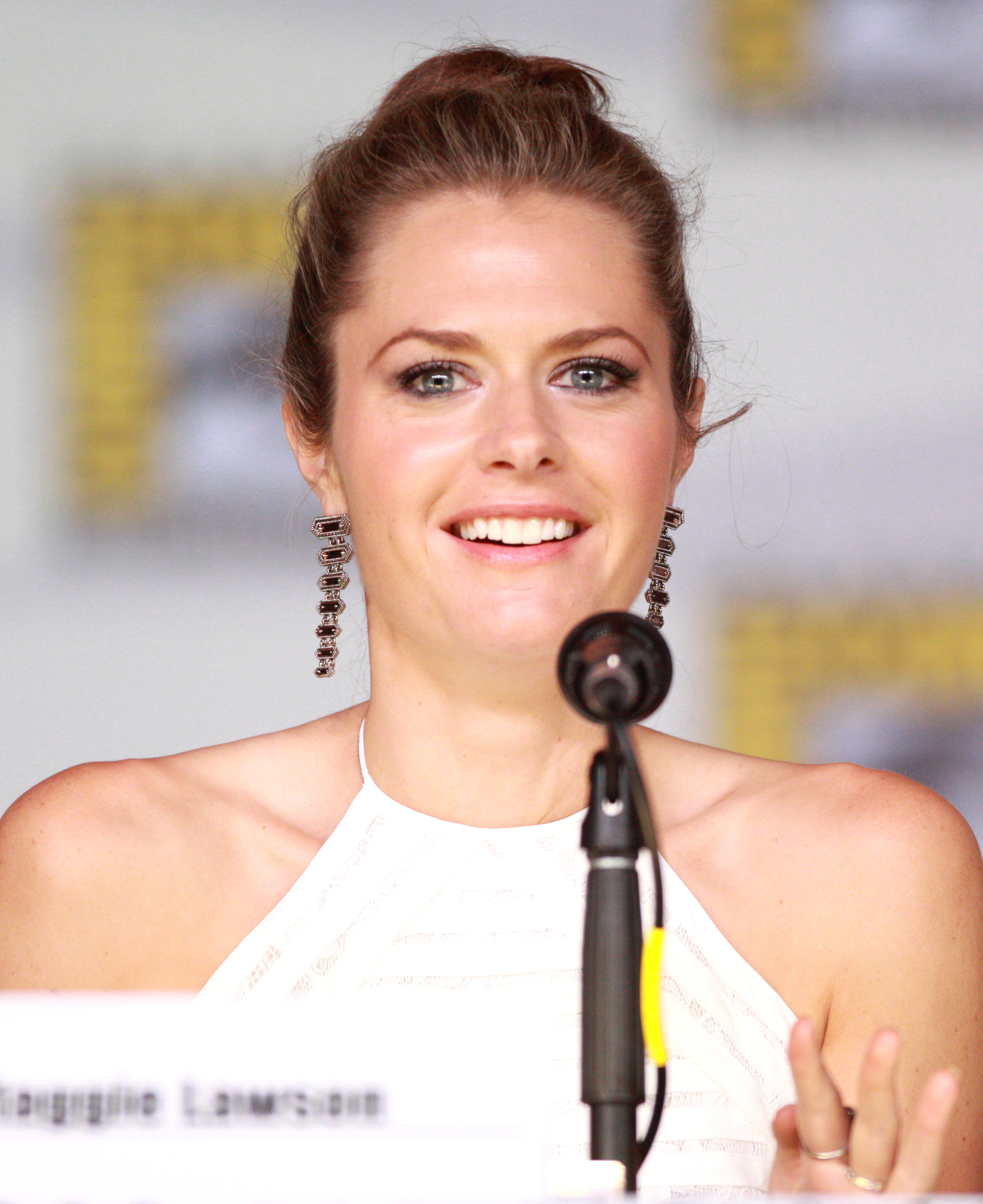
Maggie Lawson

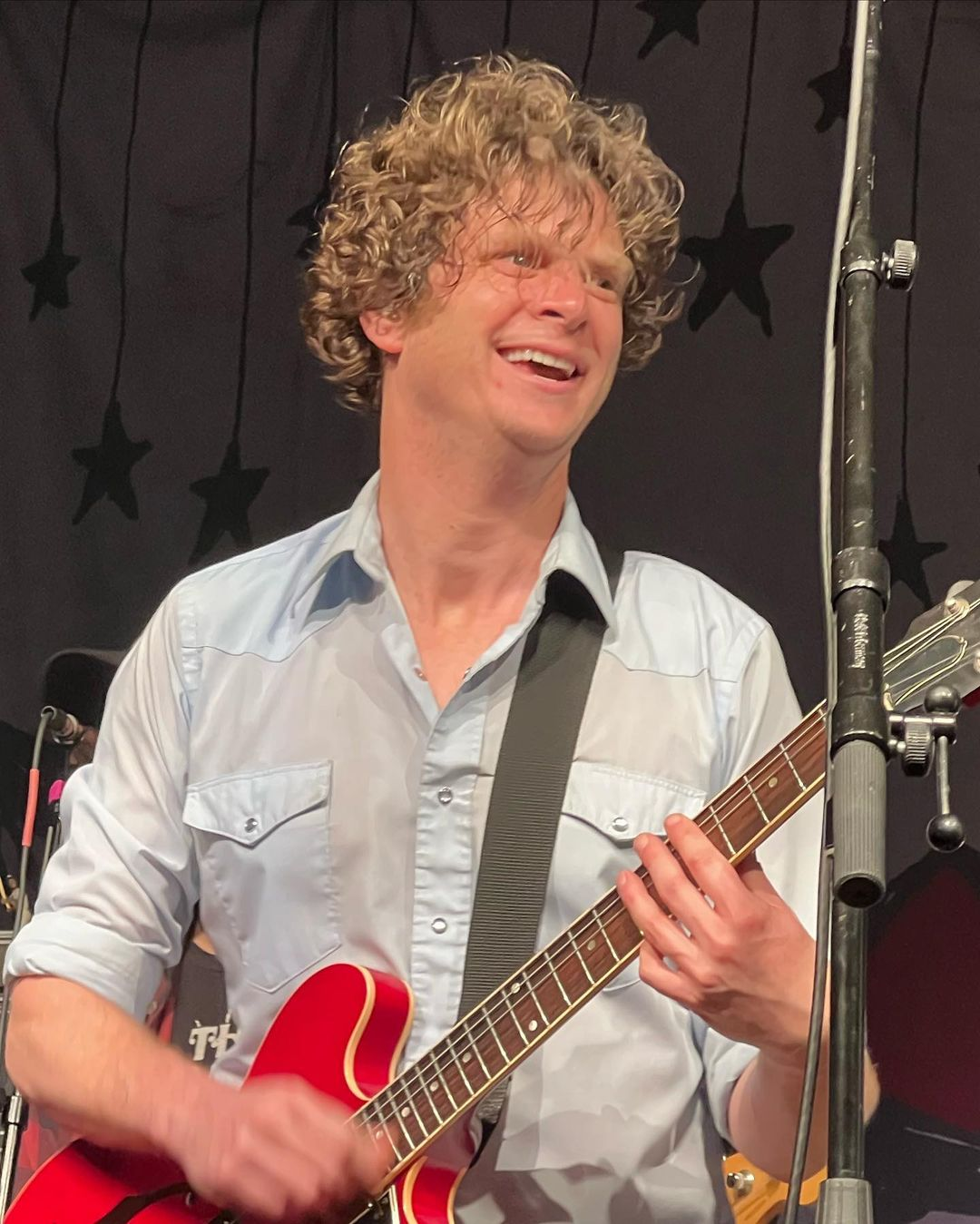
Matthew Thiessen

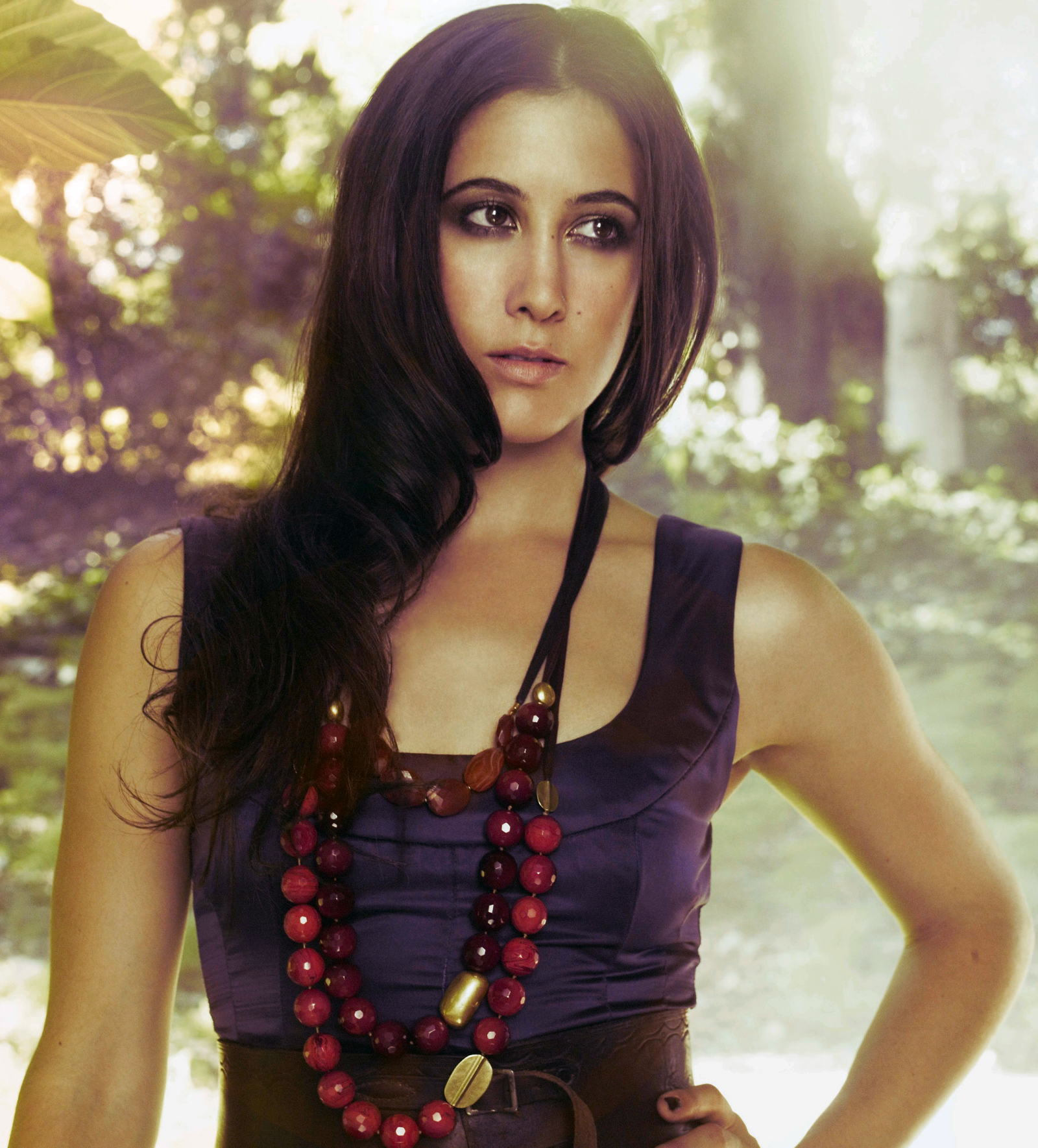
Vanessa Carlton

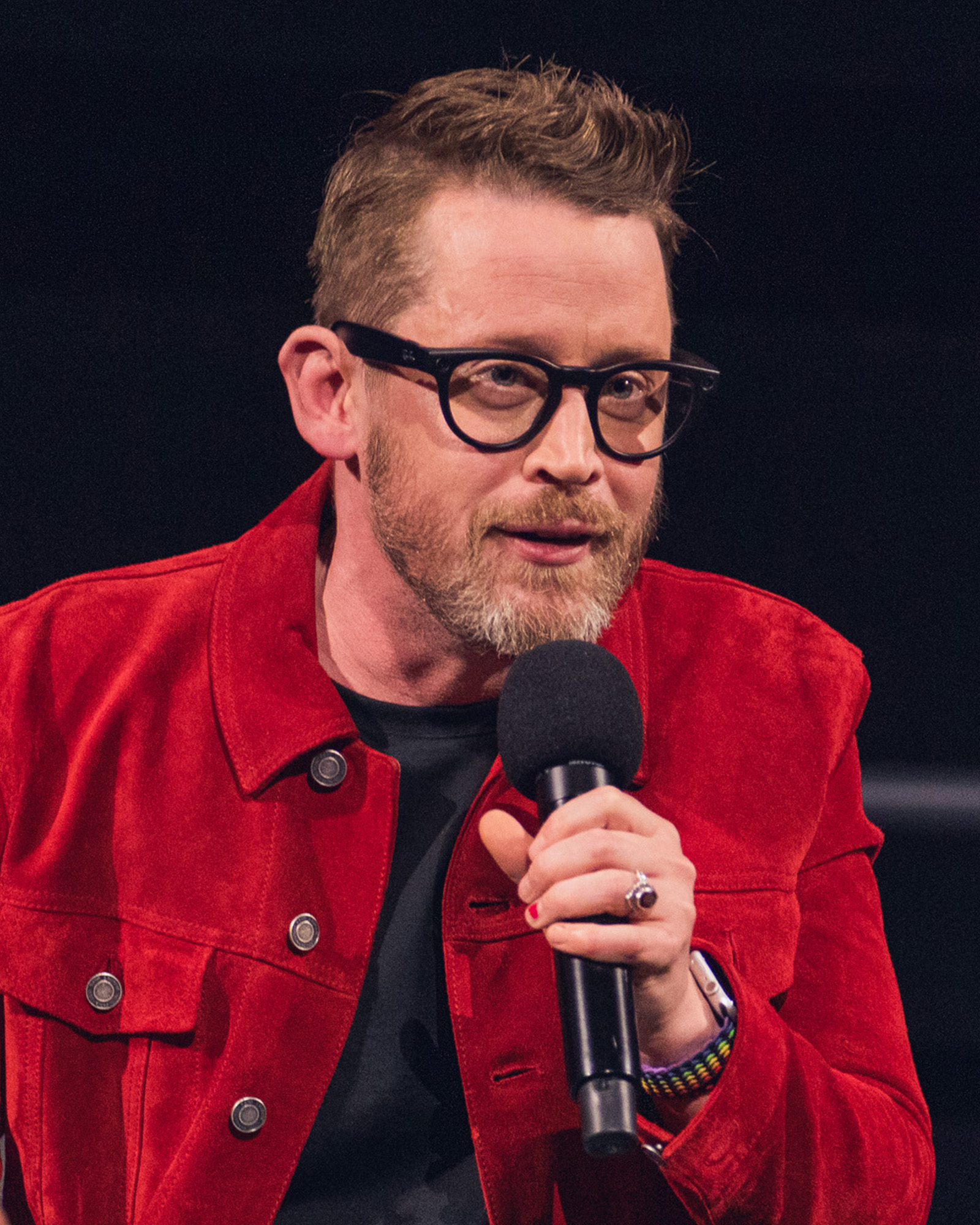
Macaulay Culkin

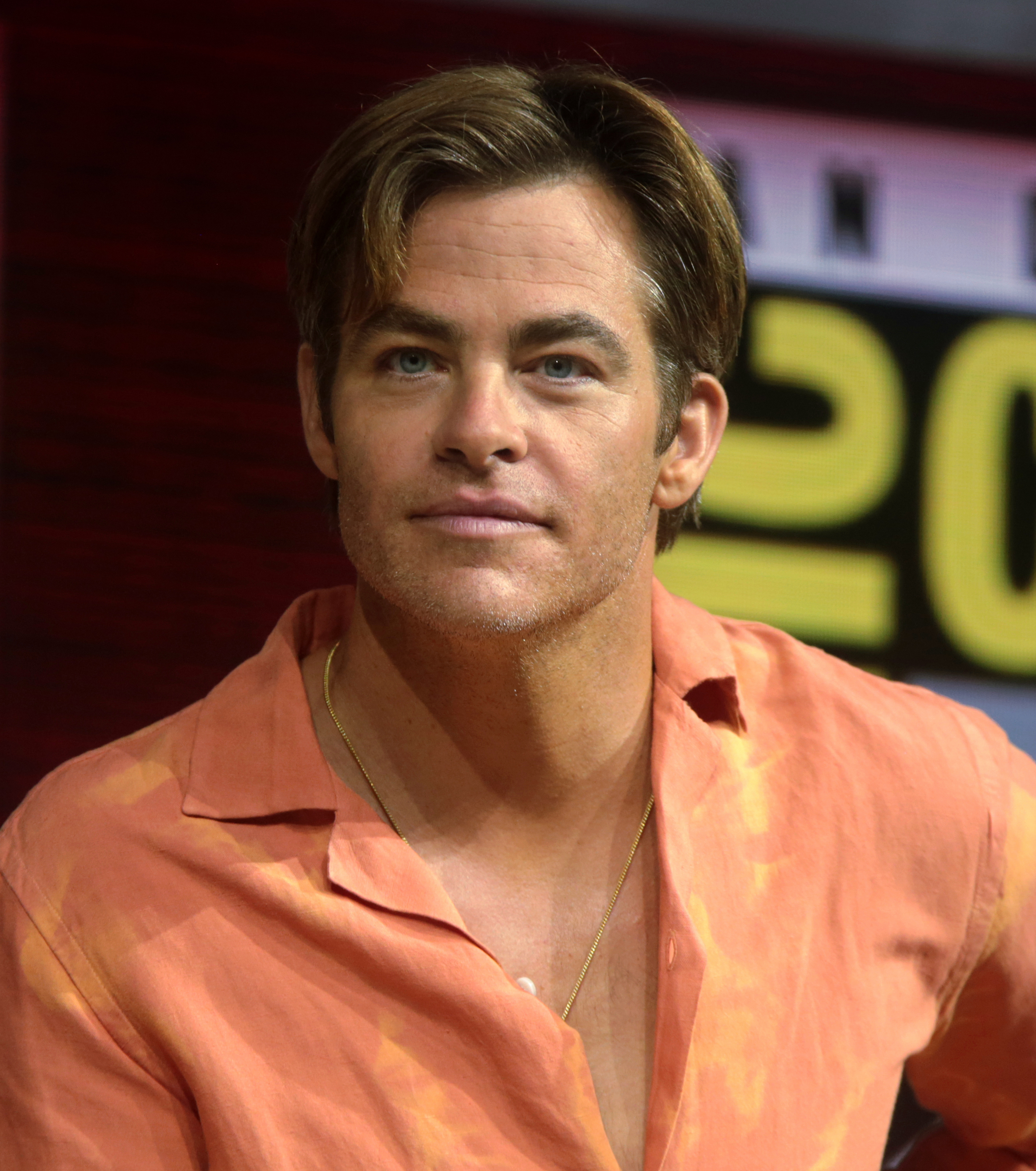
Chris Pine

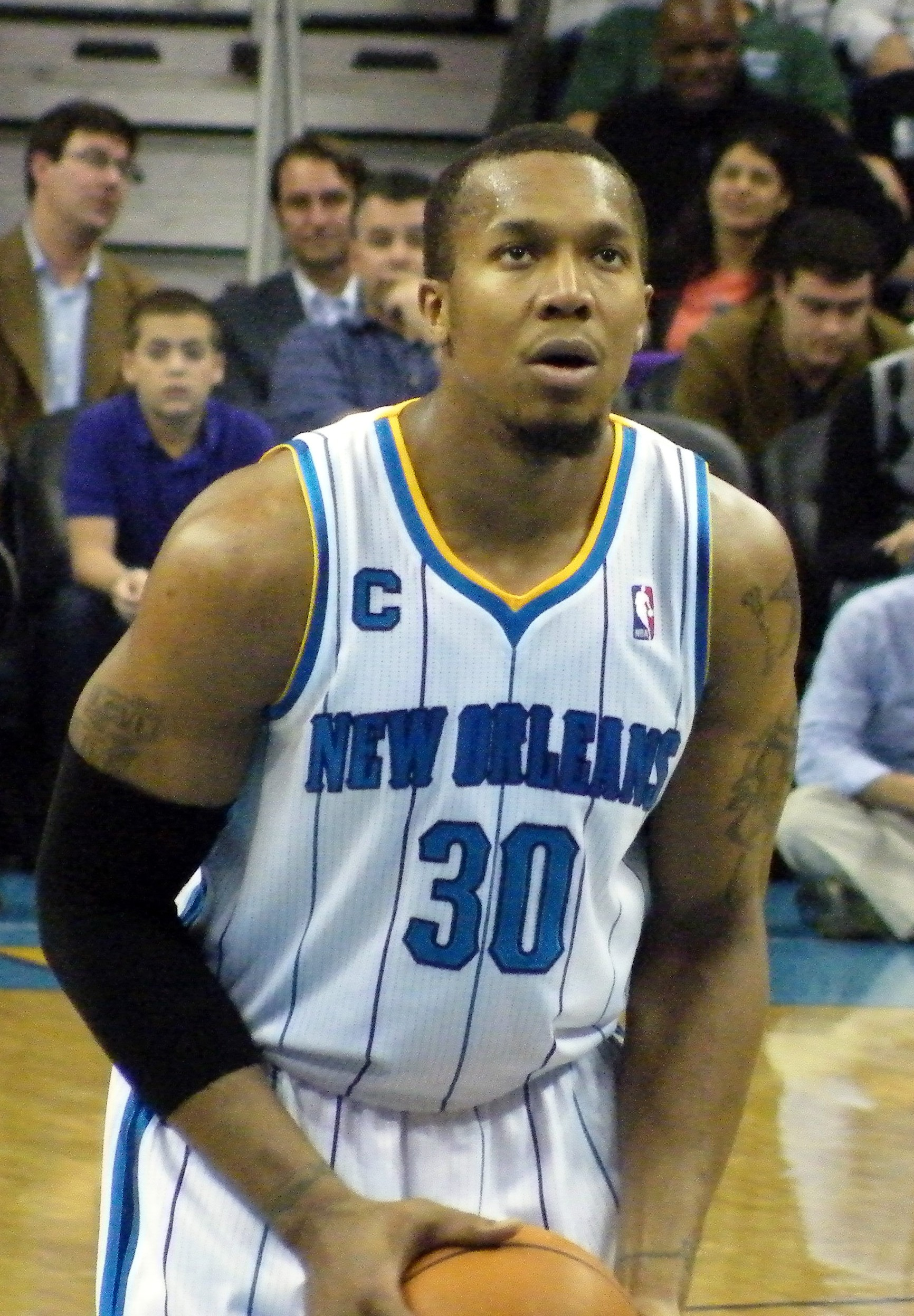
David West

- August 1 – Nadia Bjorlin, actress, singer, and model
- August 2 – Diandra Asbaty, bowler
- August 3
  - Nadia Ali, Libyan-born singer/songwriter
  - Matthew Behrmann, tennis player
  - Peter Burr, digital and new media artist
  - Brandan Schieppati, singer and frontman for Bleeding Through
- August 4
  - Asad Abdul-Khaliq, football player
  - Emily Best, producer, entrepreneur, and founder and CEO of Seed&Spark
- August 6
  - Will Pan, American-born Taiwanese singer/songwriter and actor
  - Seneca Wallace, football player
- August 8
  - Armenchik, Armenian-born pop singer
  - Shayna Baszler, wrestler and martial artist
  - Craig Breslow, baseball player
- August 9
  - Annie Andrews, pediatrician and politician
  - Texas Battle, actor
- August 10 – Aaron Staton, actor
- August 11
  - Hakim Akbar, football player
  - Allison Baver, Olympic speed skater
  - Kurt Birkins, baseball player
  - Merritt Wever, actress
- August 12
  - Maggie Lawson, actress
  - Frankie Saenz, mixed martial artist
  - Matt Thiessen, Canadian-born singer and frontman for Relient K
- August 13
  - Richard Angulo, football player and coach
  - Eric Appel, writer and director
  - Jonah Bayliss, baseball player
- August 14
  - Joseph Abruzzo, politician
  - Michael Bauer, basketball player
  - Roy Williams, football player
- August 15
  - Mel Baggs, autistic and non-binary blogger (d. 2020)
  - Jon Beutjer, football player
  - Milford Brown, football player
- August 16
  - Atari Blitzkrieg, hip hop artist
  - Vanessa Carlton, singer/songwriter, and pianist
  - Ryan Hanigan, baseball player
- August 17
  - Derek Armstrong, politician
  - Lindsey Leavitt, author
  - David Legwand, hockey player
- August 18
  - Anders Blewett, politician
  - Ry Bradley, singer/songwriter and musician
- August 19 – B. J. Askew, football player
- August 21
  - Chesa Boudin, politician
  - John Brotherton, actor
  - Paul Menard, race car driver
- August 23
  - Merleyn Bell, politician
  - Rex Grossman, football player
- August 24 – Zac Alcorn, football player
- August 25
  - Casey Atwood, stock car racing driver
  - T. J. Bell, stock car racing driver
- August 26
  - Eric Basaldua, comic book artist
  - Jim BEANZ, singer/songwriter, actor, and vocal producer
  - Jimmy Blewett, NASCAR Whelen Modified Tour driver
  - Macaulay Culkin, actor
  - Chris Pine, actor
- August 27 – Derrick Strait, football player
- August 28
  - Tully Banta-Cain, football player
  - T. J. Beam, baseball player
  - Jimmy Blacklock, attorney and judge
  - Debra Lafave, teacher and convicted sex offender
- August 29
  - Matt Bell, author and writer
  - William Levy, Cuban-born actor
  - David West, basketball player
- August 30
  - Russ Adams, baseball player
  - Adam Bergman, cyclist
  - Colin Branch, football player
- August 31 – Joe Budden, media personality and rapper

=== September ===
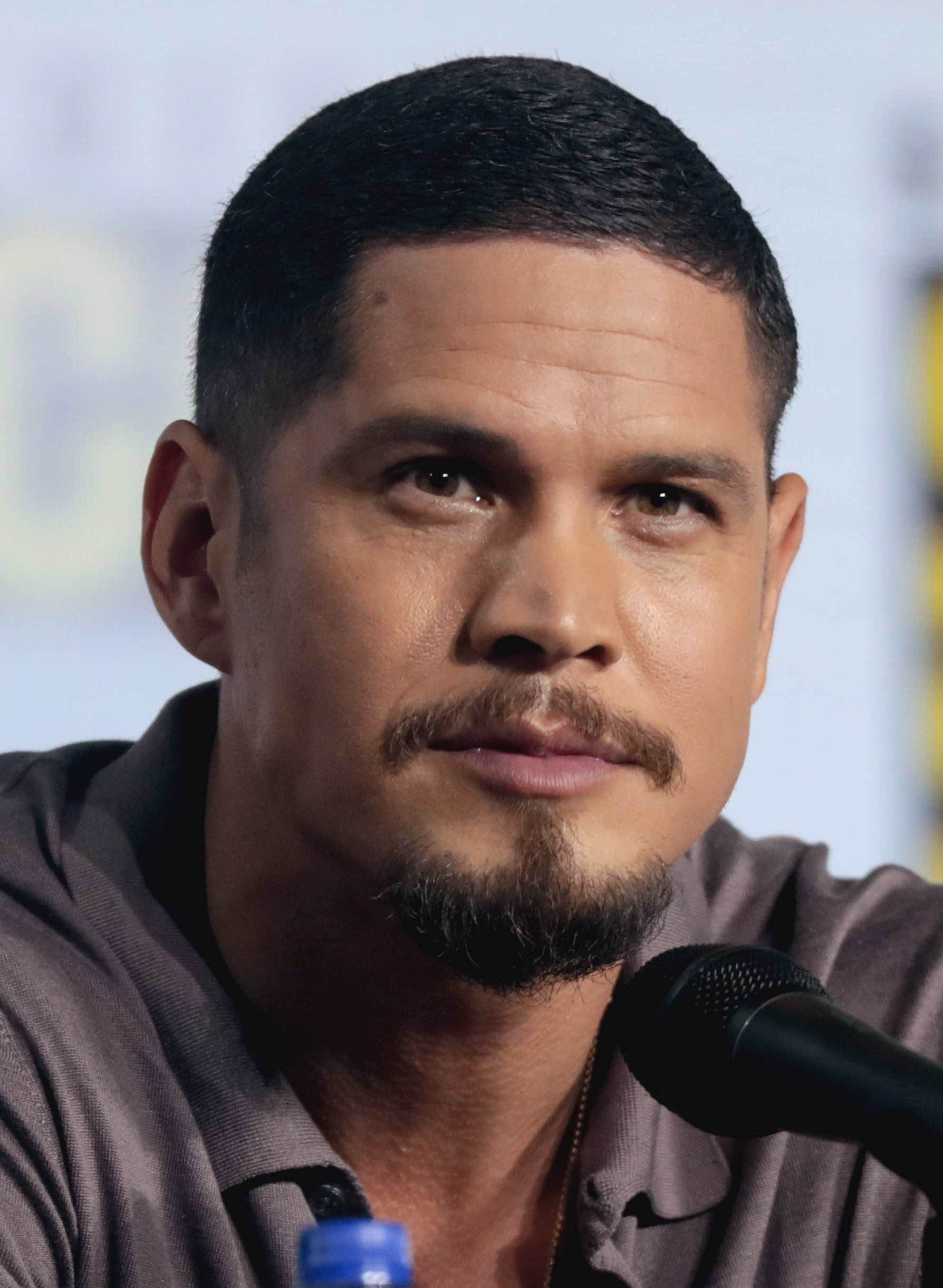
J.D. Pardo

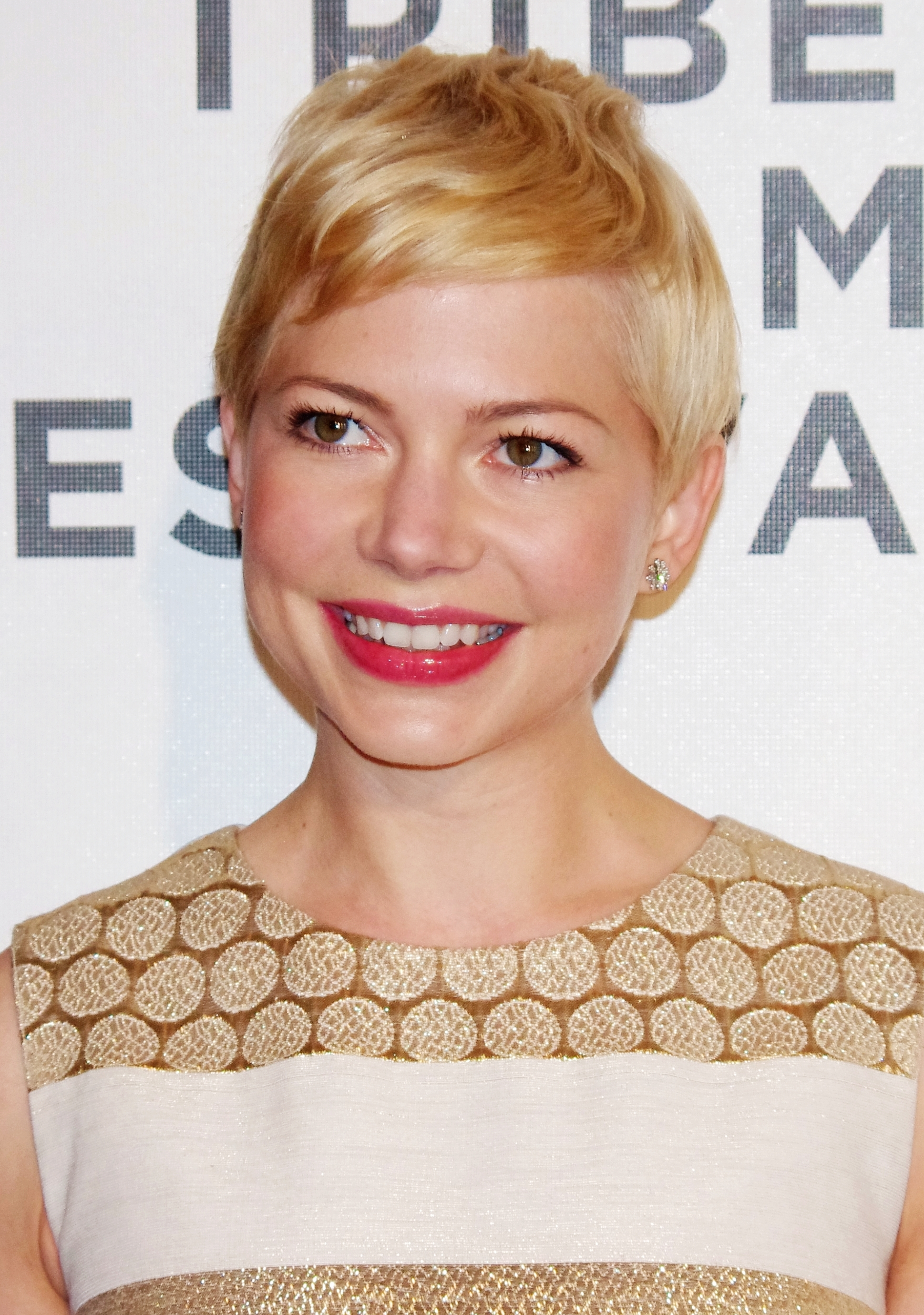
Michelle Williams

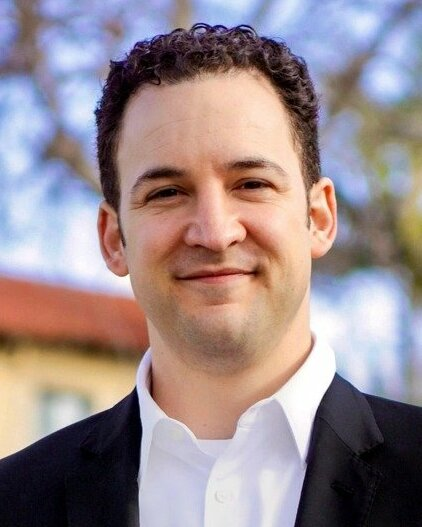
Ben Savage

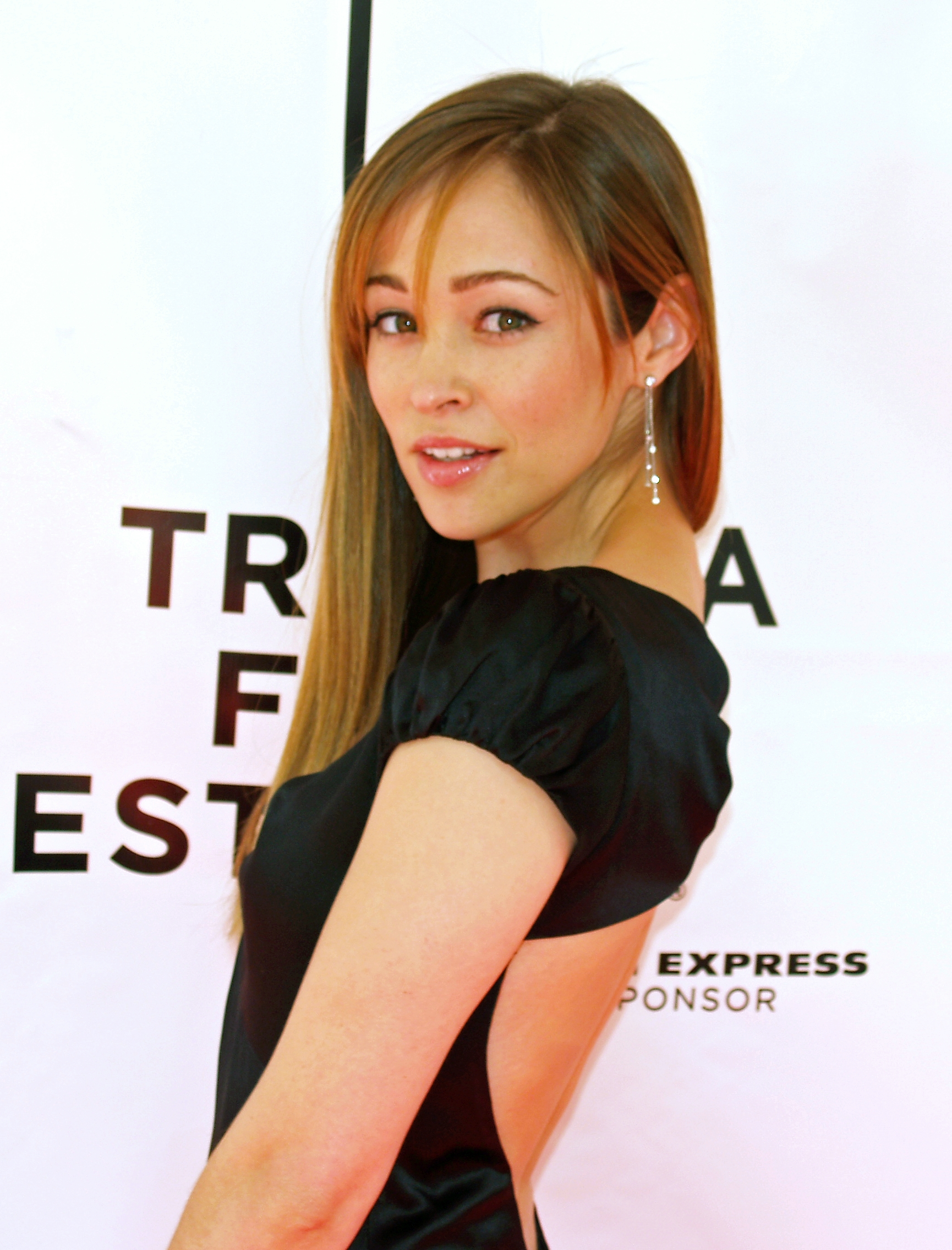
Autumn Reeser

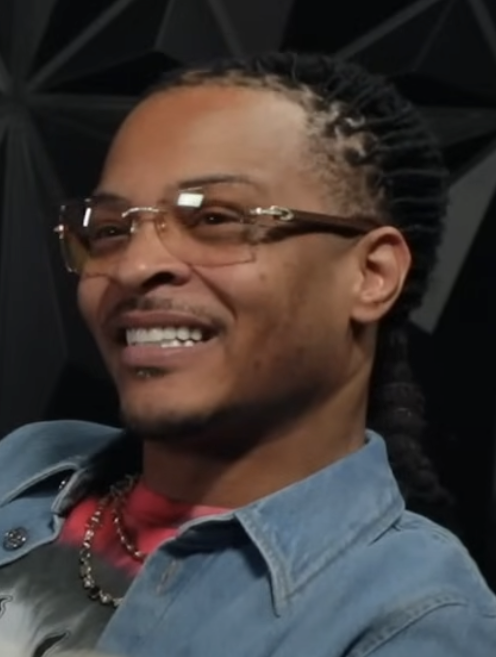
T.I.

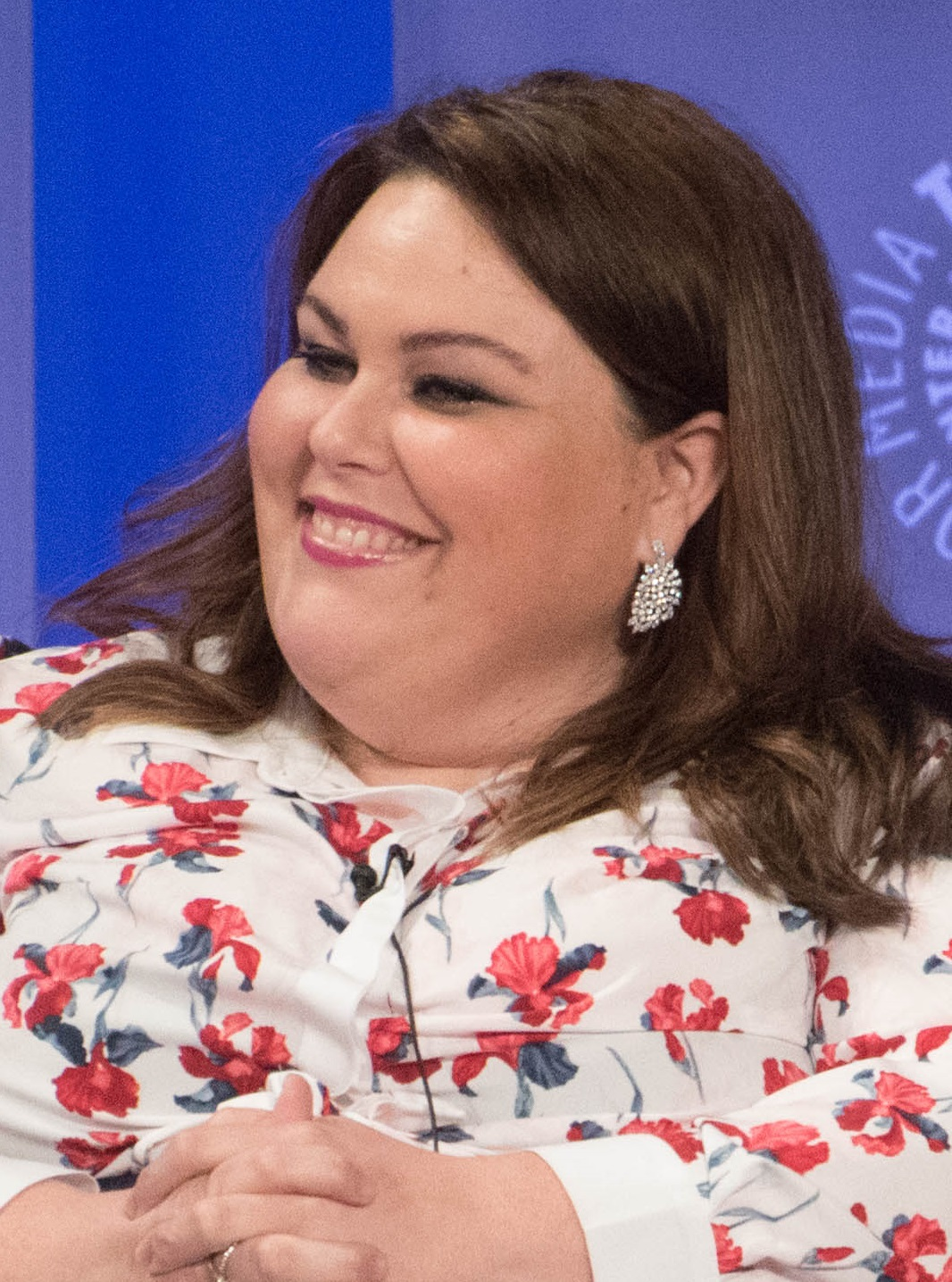
Chrissy Metz

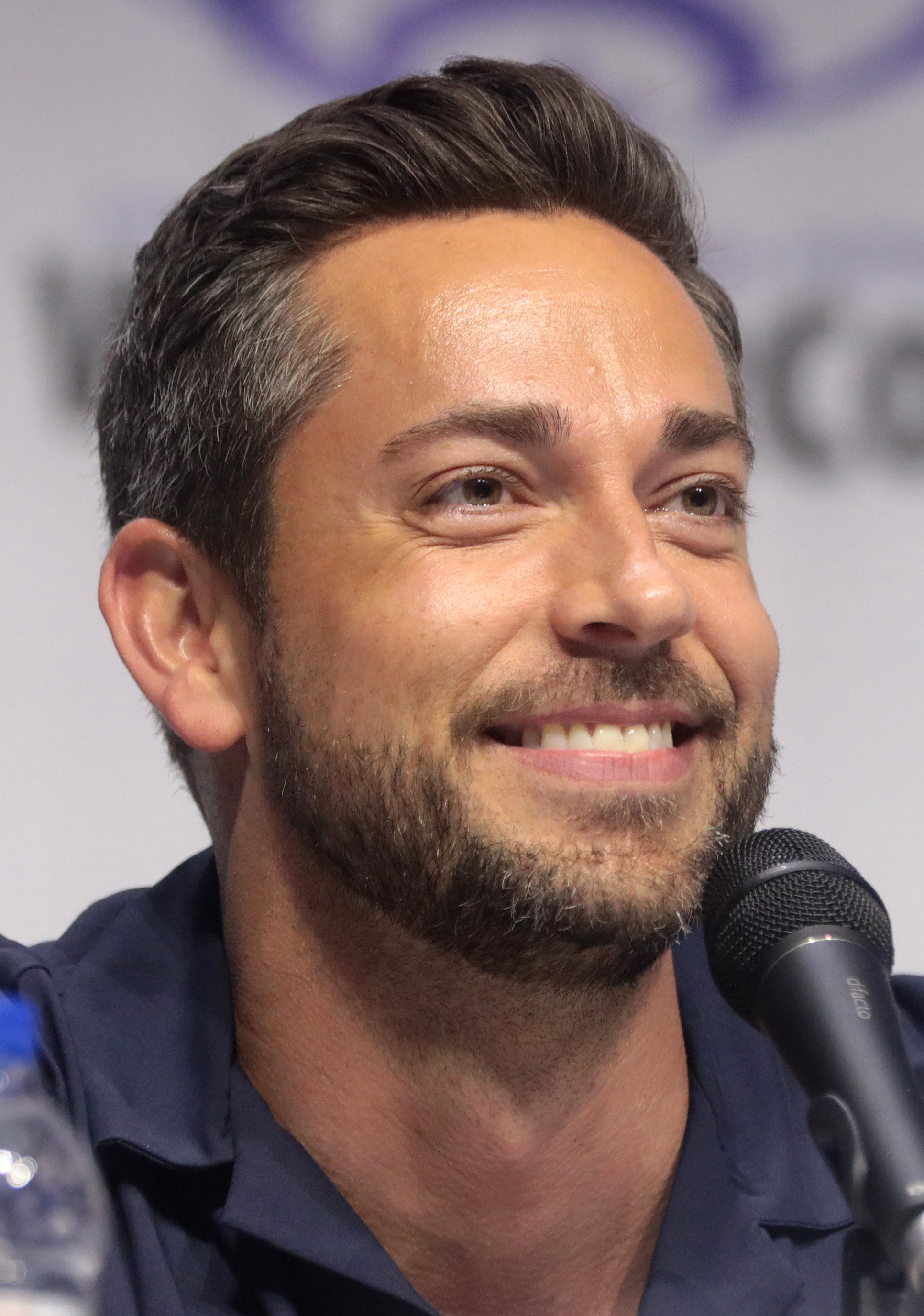
Zachary Levi

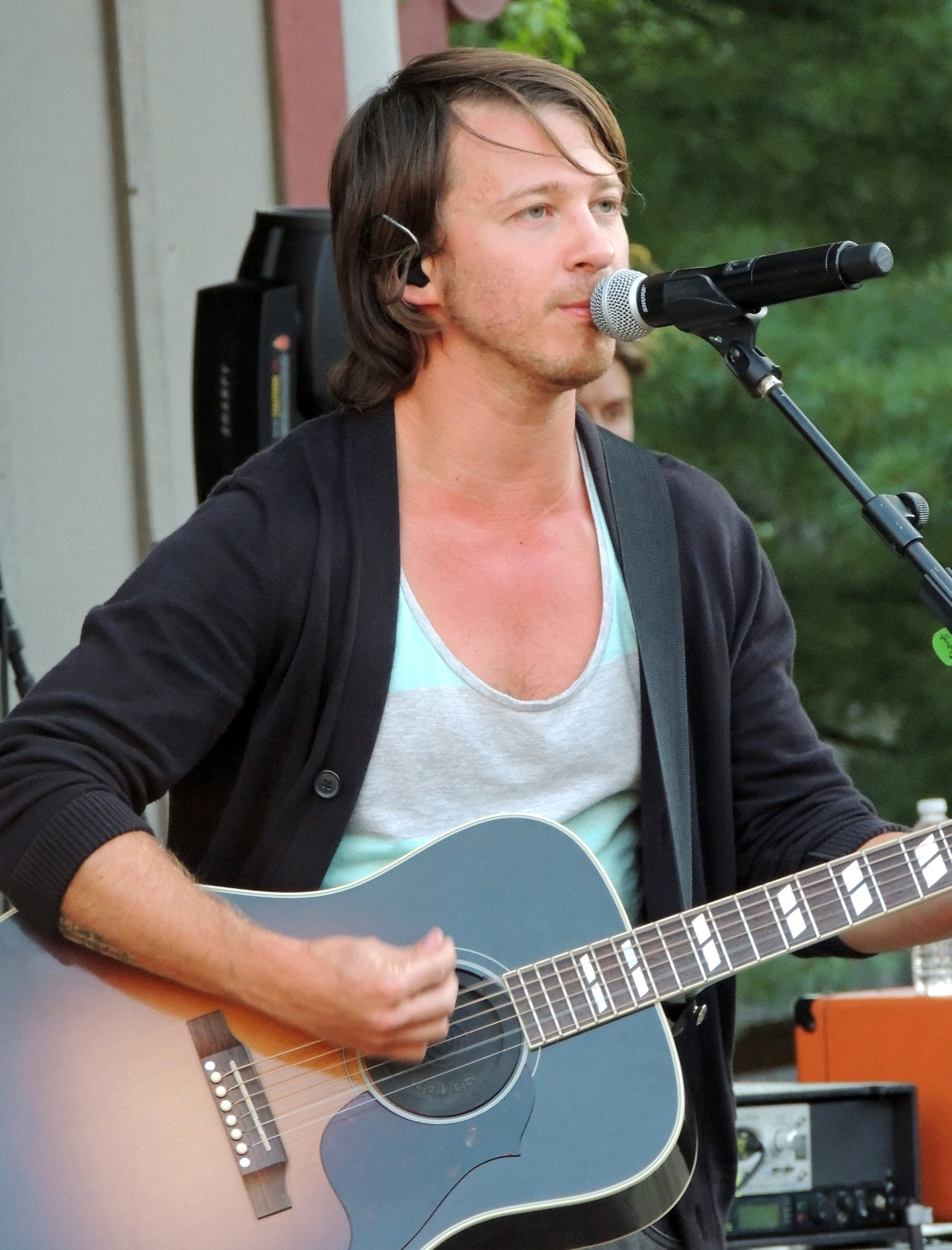
Mike Donehey

- September 1 – Bruno Agra, Brazilian-born heavy metal drummer
- September 2 – Gerry Rosenthal, actor
- September 3
  - Caleb Miller, football player
  - Jennie Finch, softball player
  - Michael Fanone, police officer
- September 4
  - Zachary Abel, actor
  - DJ Bonics, hip hop disk jockey
- September 6
  - Blaze Berdahl, actress
  - Jillian Hall, wrestler
- September 7
  - Raj Bhavsar, Olympic artistic gymnast
  - J.D. Pardo, actor
  - Mark Prior, baseball player
- September 8
  - Daniel Arsham, artist
  - Eric Hutchinson, singer/songwriter
  - Neferteri Shepherd, model and actress
- September 9
  - Denise Quiñones, Puerto Rican-born actress, Miss Universe 2001
  - Michelle Williams, actress
- September 10
  - Trevor Murdoch, wrestler
  - Mikey Way, bassist for My Chemical Romance
- September 11 – Tanisha Brito, beauty pageant titleholder
- September 12
  - Wendell Bryant, football player
  - Sean Burroughs, baseball player (died 2024)
  - Joe Loeffler, bassist for Chevelle
- September 13
  - Curtis Borchardt, basketball player
  - Ben Savage, actor
- September 14 – Nicole Abusharif, convicted murderer
- September 15
  - Tammie Brown, drag queen and television personality
  - Bump J, rapper
  - Ben Woolf, actor (died 2015)
- September 16
  - Jake Anderson, fishing captain and television personality
  - Peter Bailey, author and journalist
  - Vanessa Peters, singer and songwriter
- September 18 – Jonathan Biss, pianist, teacher, and writer
- September 19
  - J. R. Bremer, American-born Bosnian basketball player
  - Phillip Buchanon, football player
  - Josh Haeder, politician
- September 20
  - Francis Awerkamp, politician
  - Yung Joc, rapper
- September 21
  - Aslyn, pop singer/songwriter
  - Brianna Keilar, journalist
  - Autumn Reeser, actress
- September 22 – Sandra Smith, news reporter
- September 25
  - Jeremiah Bitsui, actor
  - Chris Owen, actor
  - T.I., rapper, film and music producer, actor, and author
- September 26 – J. P. Blecksmith, Marine Corp 2nd Lieutenant (d. 2004)
- September 27 – Paul Arnold, football player
- September 28
  - Reggie Brown, writer, actor, and comedic impersonator
  - Chrissy Metz, Actress
- September 29
  - Tony Brown, football player
  - Zachary Levi, actor and singer
- September 30
  - Virgil Abloh, fashion designer (d. 2021)
  - Bryan Bullington, baseball player
  - Mike Donehey, Christian singer/songwriter, guitarist, and frontman for Tenth Avenue North
  - Toni Trucks, actress
  - Emily Kokal, rock vocalist and guitarist

=== October ===
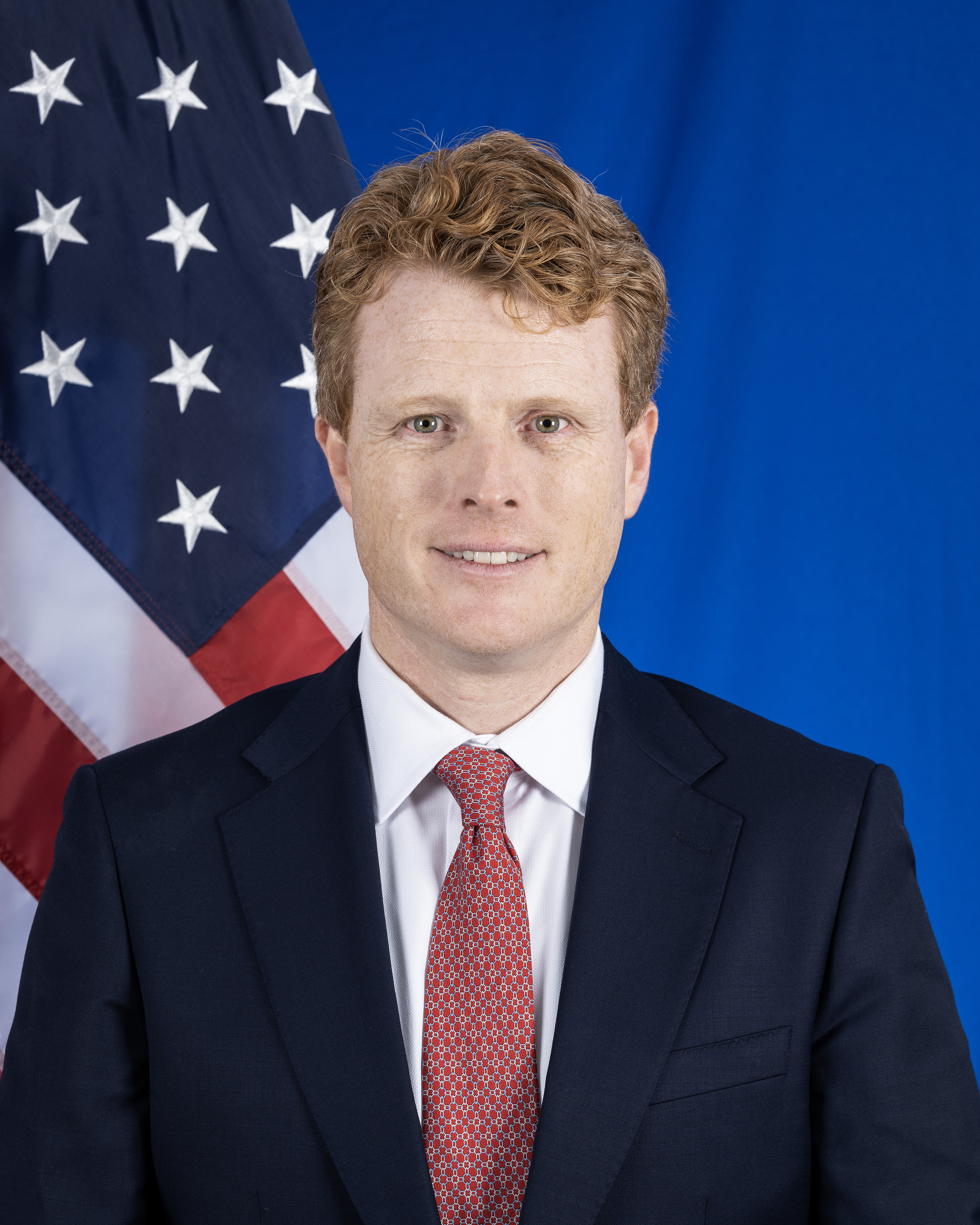
Joe Kennedy III

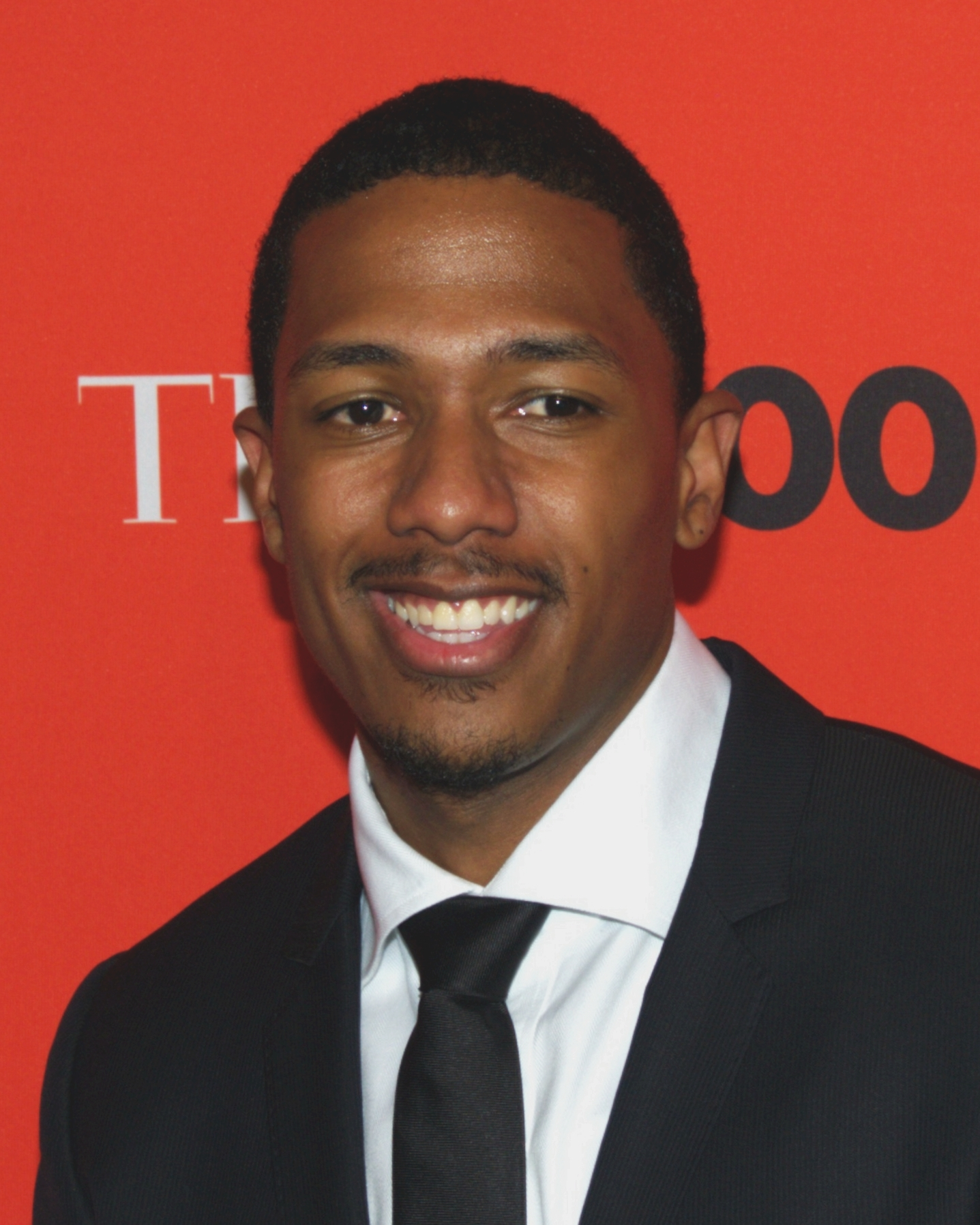
Nick Cannon

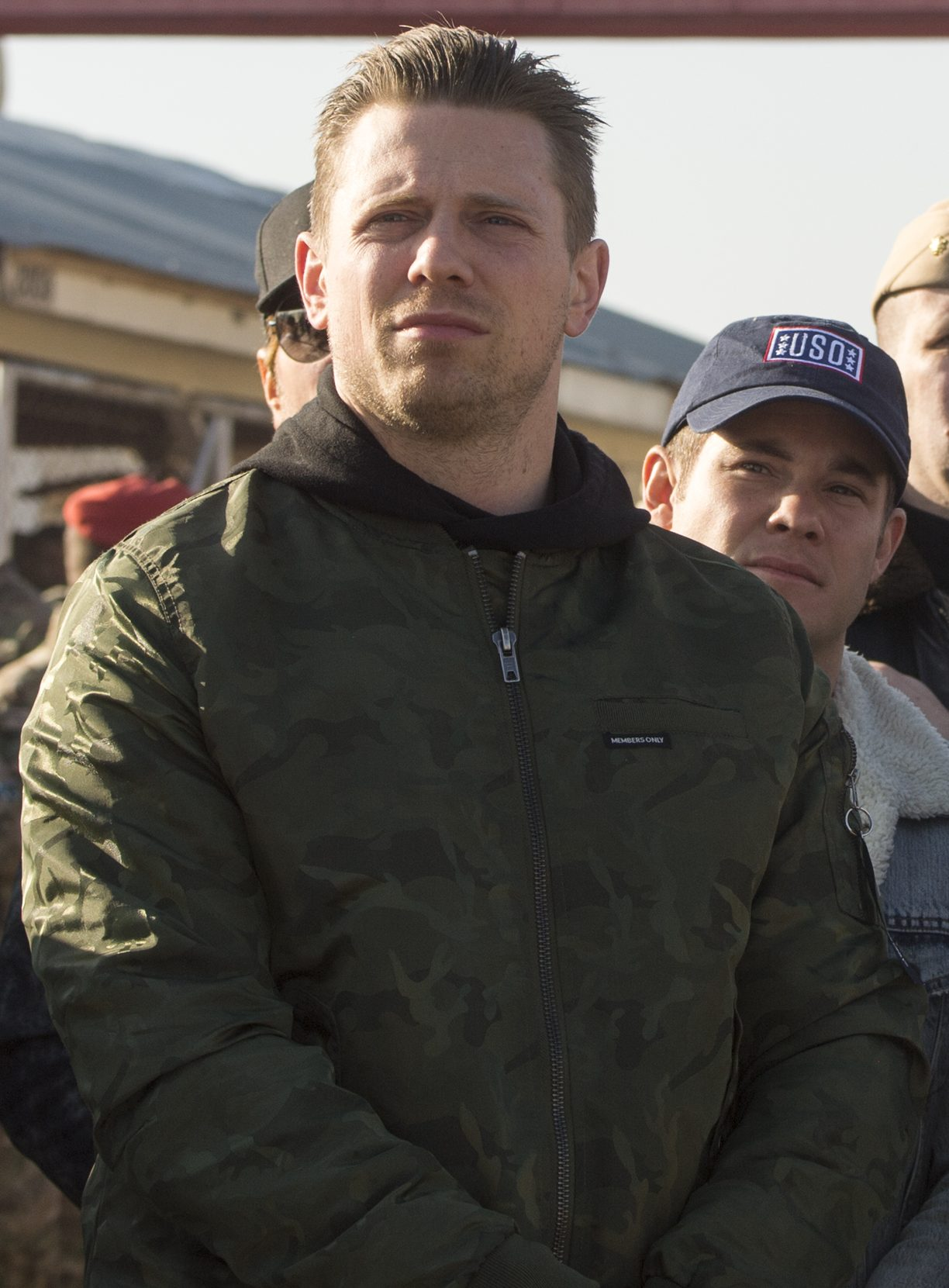
The Miz

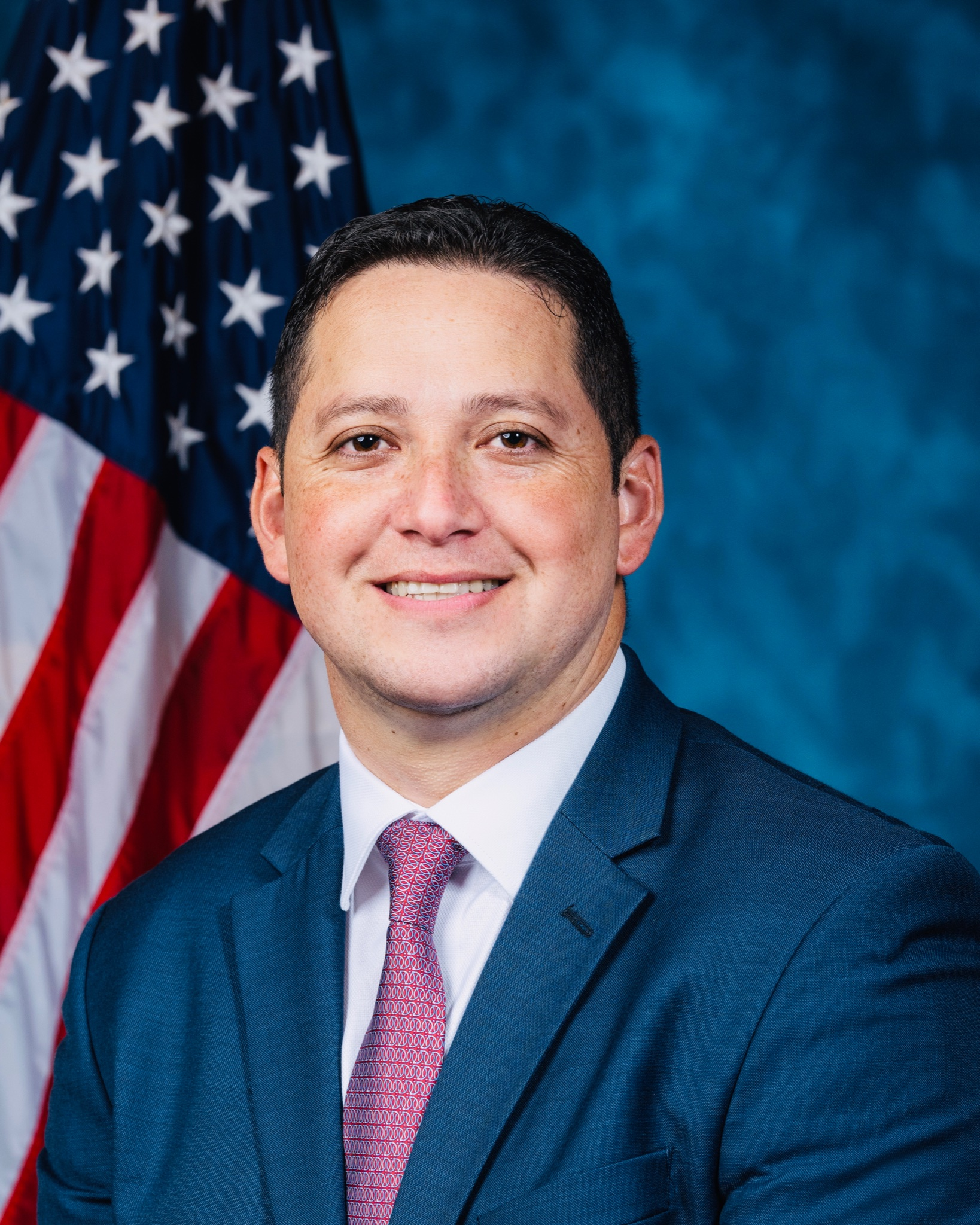
Tony Gonzales

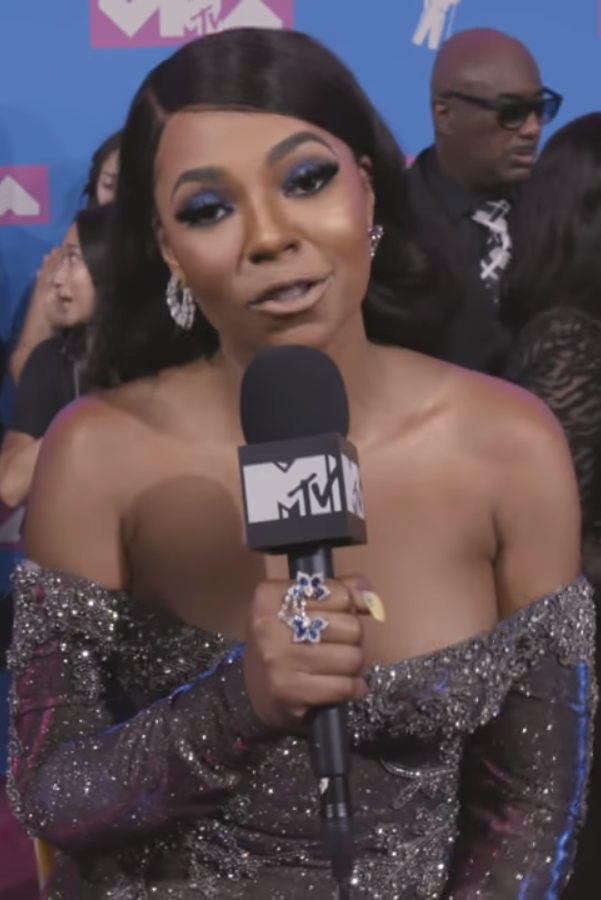
Ashanti

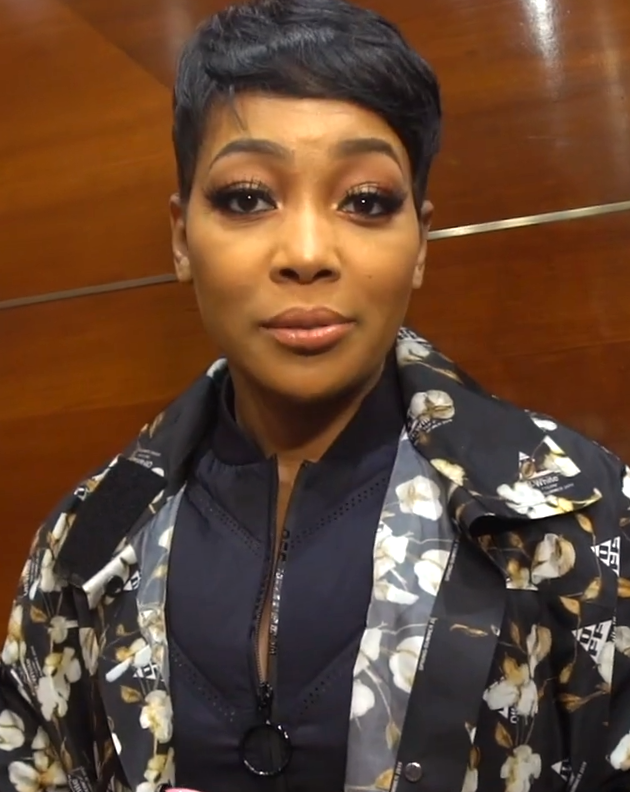
Monica

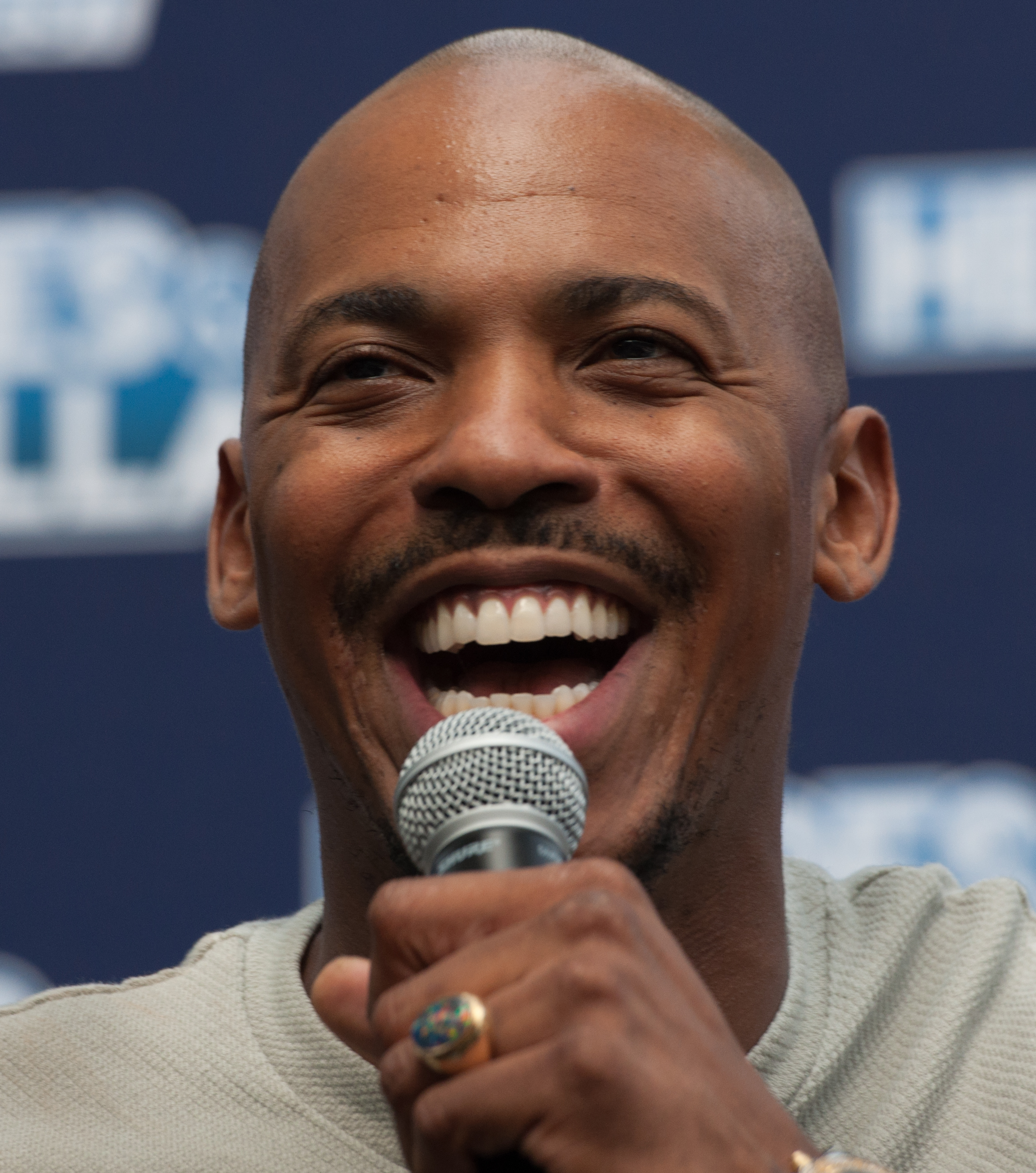
Mehcad Brooks

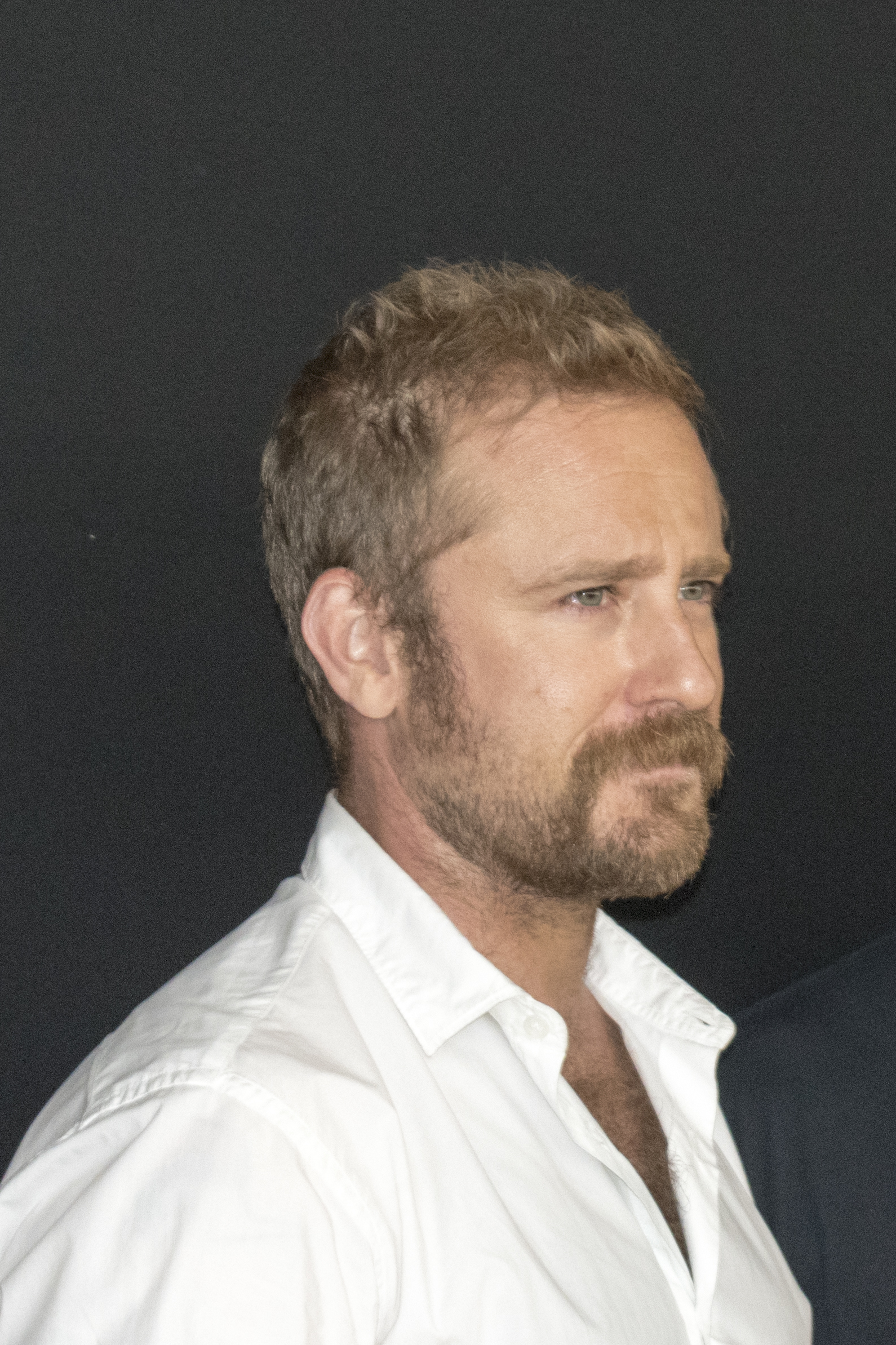
Ben Foster

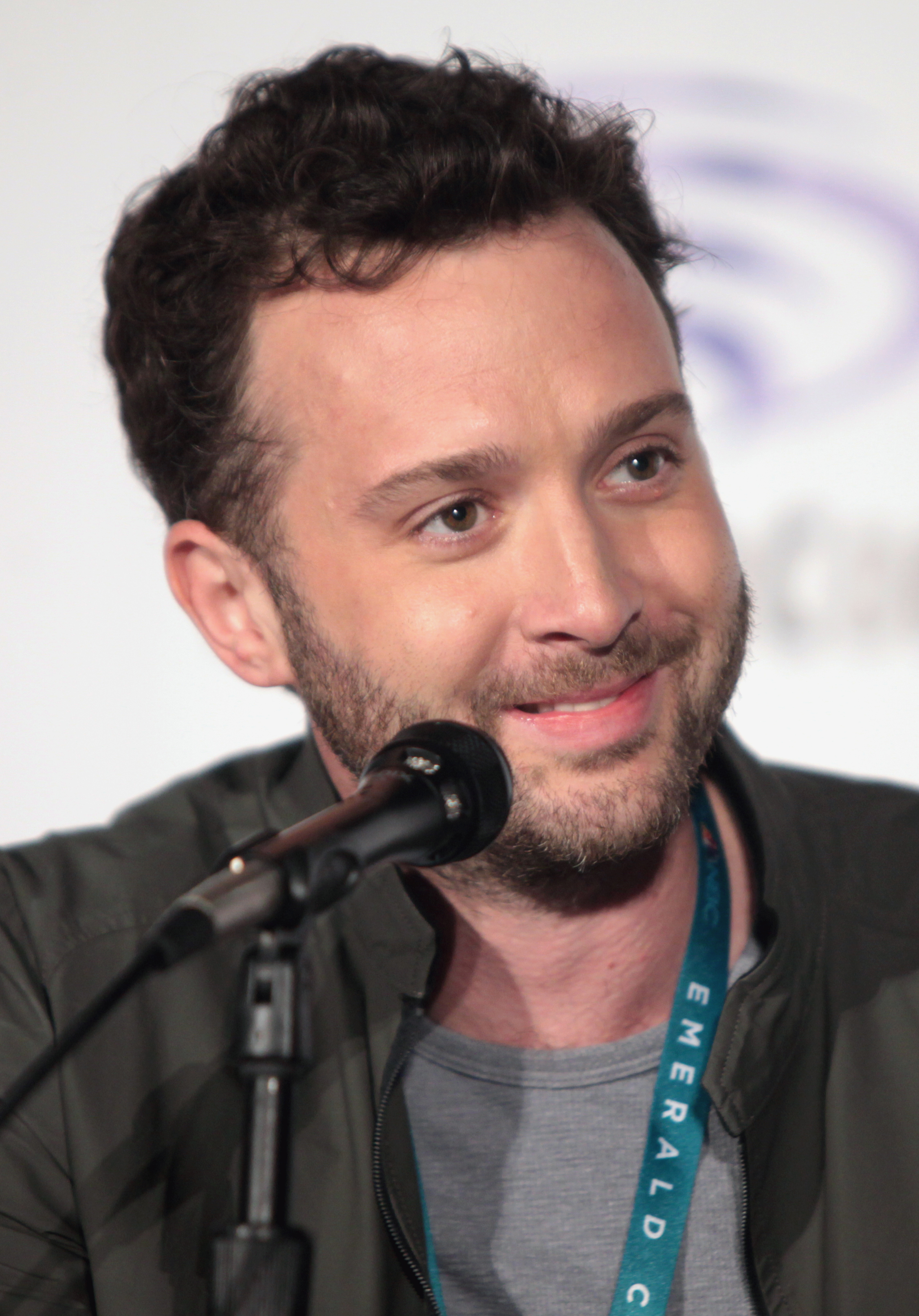
Eddie Kaye Thomas

- October 1
  - La Farrell Bunting, boxer
  - Sarah Drew, actress
- October 2 – Shane Andrus, football player
- October 3
  - Timothy Barr, politician
  - Anquan Boldin, football player
- October 4
  - Me'Lisa Barber, sprinter
  - Mikele Barber, sprinter
  - Jackie Burns, actor and singer
  - Tim Kelleher, musician
  - Joe Kennedy III, politician
  - Lucian Piane, composer and music producer (died 2026)
  - Jason Samuels Smith, tap dancer
  - Morgan Spector, actor
- October 5
  - Roy Anderson, football player
  - Craig Benzine, video producer, musician, and vlogger
  - Ti West, film director
- October 6 – Rod Babers, football player
- October 8
  - Jenni Branam, soccer player
  - Nick Cannon, comedian, rapper, and television host
  - The Miz, reality star, wrestler, and actor
- October 9 – Justin Cronin, politician (died 2020)
- October 10
  - Terreal Bierria, football player
  - Mark Castillo, metalcore drummer for Bury Your Dead
  - Tony Gonzales, politician
- October 11
  - Meghann Burke, soccer player
  - Bridget Powers, pornographic actress
- October 13
  - Ashanti, singer/songwriter, record producer, model, dancer, and actress
  - Jon Micah Sumrall, singer and frontman for Kutless
- October 14
  - John Edgar Browning, author, editor, and scholar
  - Terrence McGee, football player
- October 15 – Jamie Burke, rugby player
- October 16
  - Brad Balukjian, writer and science professor
  - Sue Bird, American-born Israeli basketball player
- October 17
  - Seth Baum, researcher and executive director of GCRI
  - David Black, photographer and director
  - Nicholas Britell, composer, pianist, and film producer
  - Sarah Lamb, ballerina
  - Tarell Alvin McCraney, playwright and actor
  - Angel Parker, actress
  - Justin Shenkarow, actor
- October 18
  - Erin Dean, actress
  - Josh Gracin, singer
  - Colby Keller, visual artist, blogger and pornographic film actor
- October 19 – Barrington Bartley, Jamaican-born cricketer
- October 20 – Mike Brown, producer, engineer, songwriter, multi-instrumentalist, and founder of Temperamental Recordings
- October 21
  - Coretta Brown, basketball player
  - Kim Kardashian, socialite and television personality
- October 22 – D. Bryant, football player
- October 23 – Robert Belushi, actor
- October 24
  - Kamia Brown, politician
  - Monica, singer/songwriter, actress, and businesswoman
  - Casey Wilson, actress and comedian
- October 25
  - Sara Benincasa, comedian, author, and actress
  - Mehcad Brooks, actor and model
  - Torrey Butler, basketball player
- October 26 – Ifeoma Ajunwa, Nigerian-born legal scholar, writer, and tenured professor of law at the University of North Carolina School of Law
- October 28
  - Wes Ball, film director, visual effects artist, and graphic artist
  - Christy Hemme, wrestler
  - Hunter Hillenmeyer, football player
  - Kevin Lincoln, politician, mayor of Stockton, California
- October 29
  - Heidi Androl, television sports reporter
  - Michele Boyd, actress, producer, and host
  - Ben Foster, actor
- October 30
  - Chris Barth, singer/songwriter and multi-instrumentalist
  - Steve Soboslai, singer/songwriter, guitarist, and frontman for Punchline
- October 31
  - Jeff Albert, baseball coach
  - Samaire Armstrong, actress and fashion designer
  - Marc Berman, politician
  - Jason Shrout, drummer
  - Eddie Kaye Thomas, actor and comedian

=== November ===
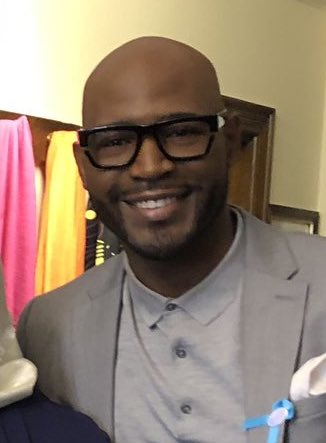
Karamo Brown

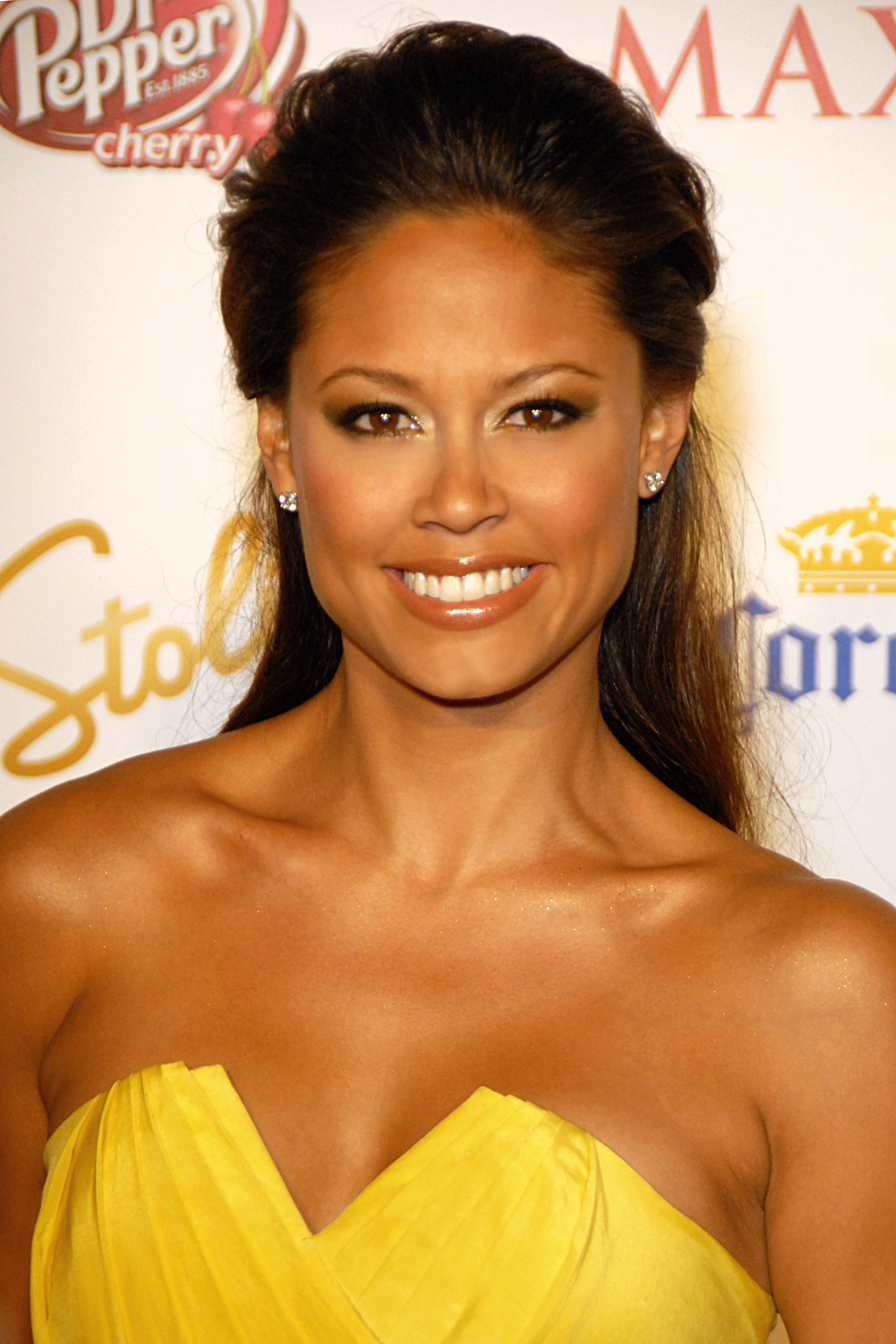
Vanessa Minnillo

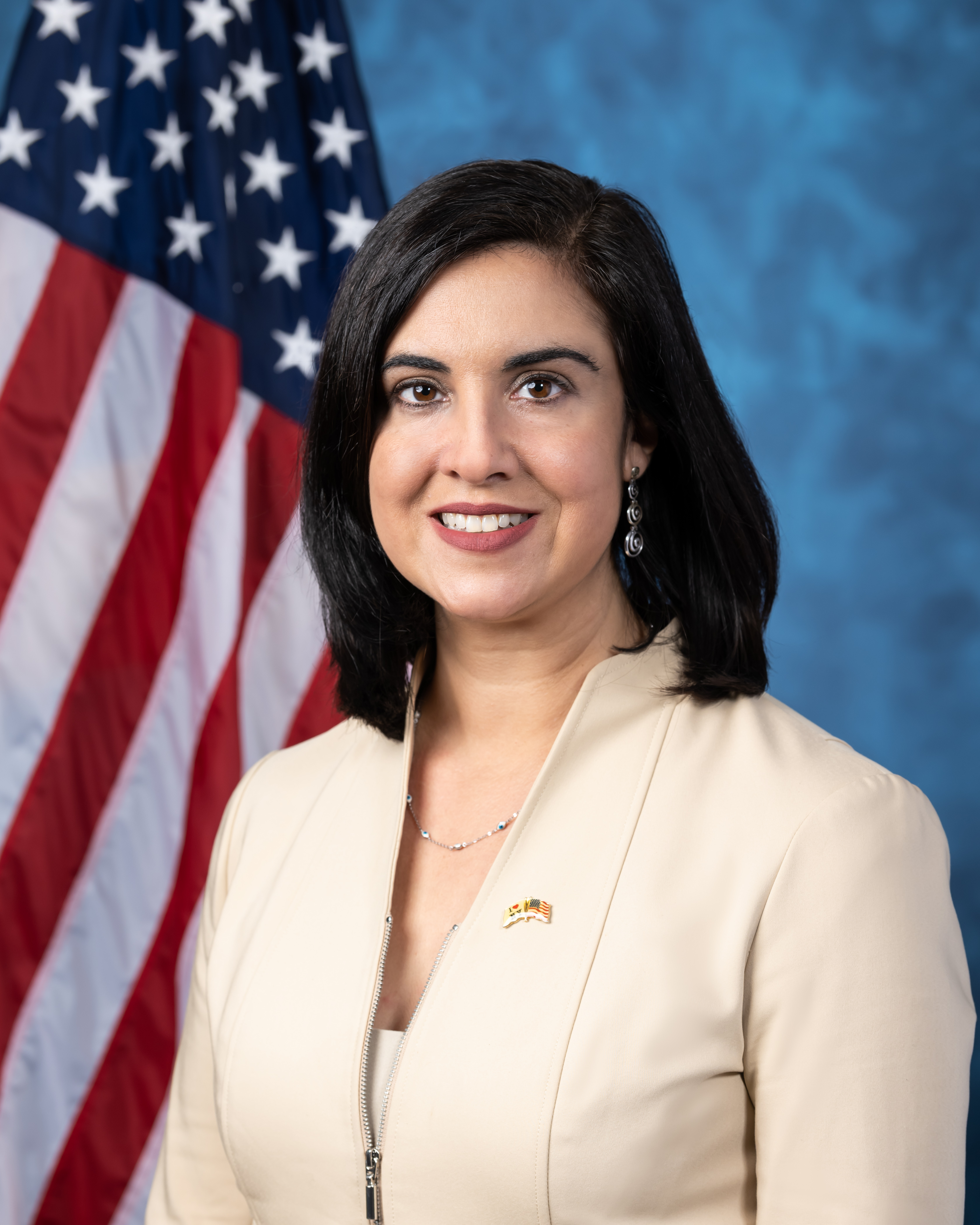
Nicole Malliotakis

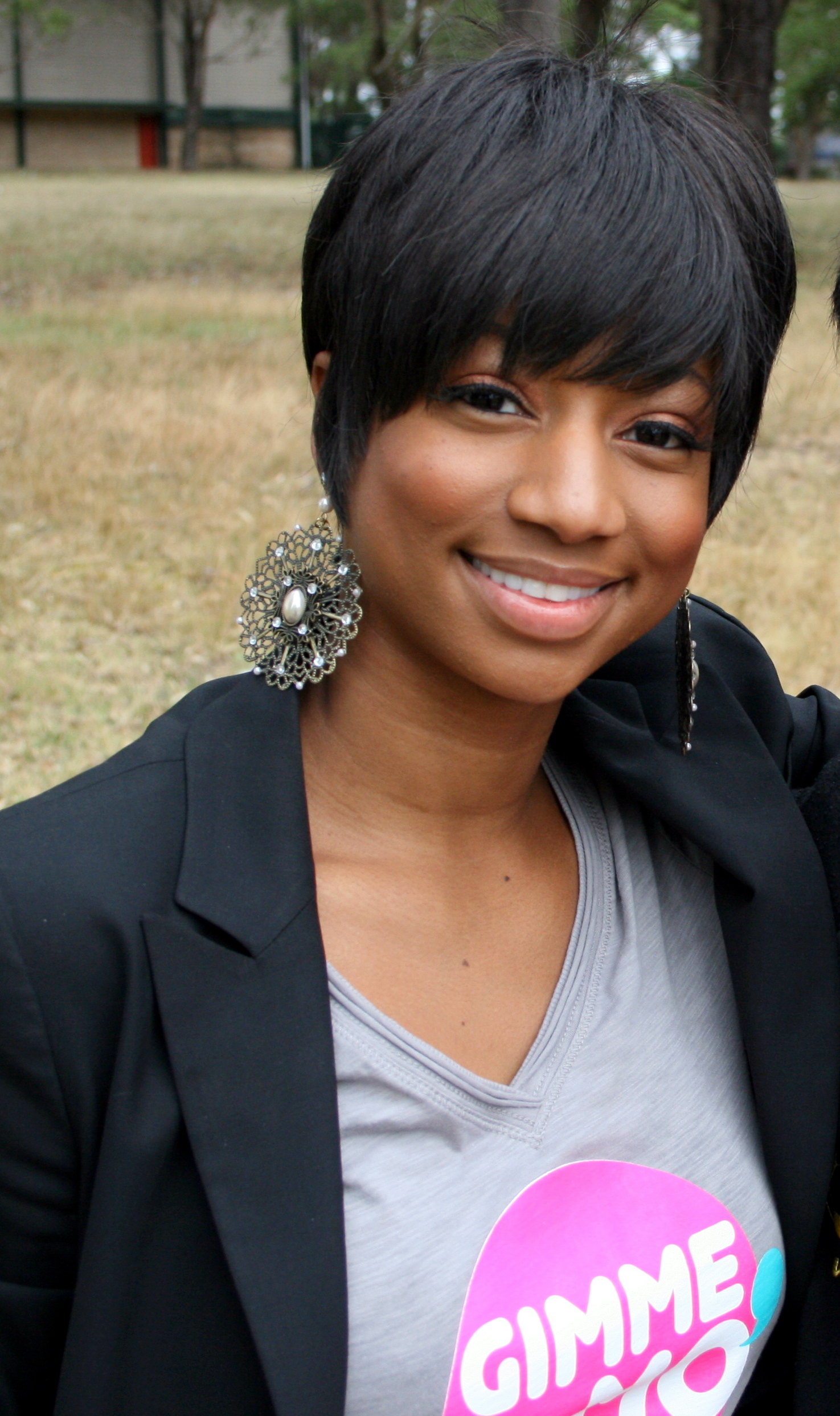
Monique Coleman

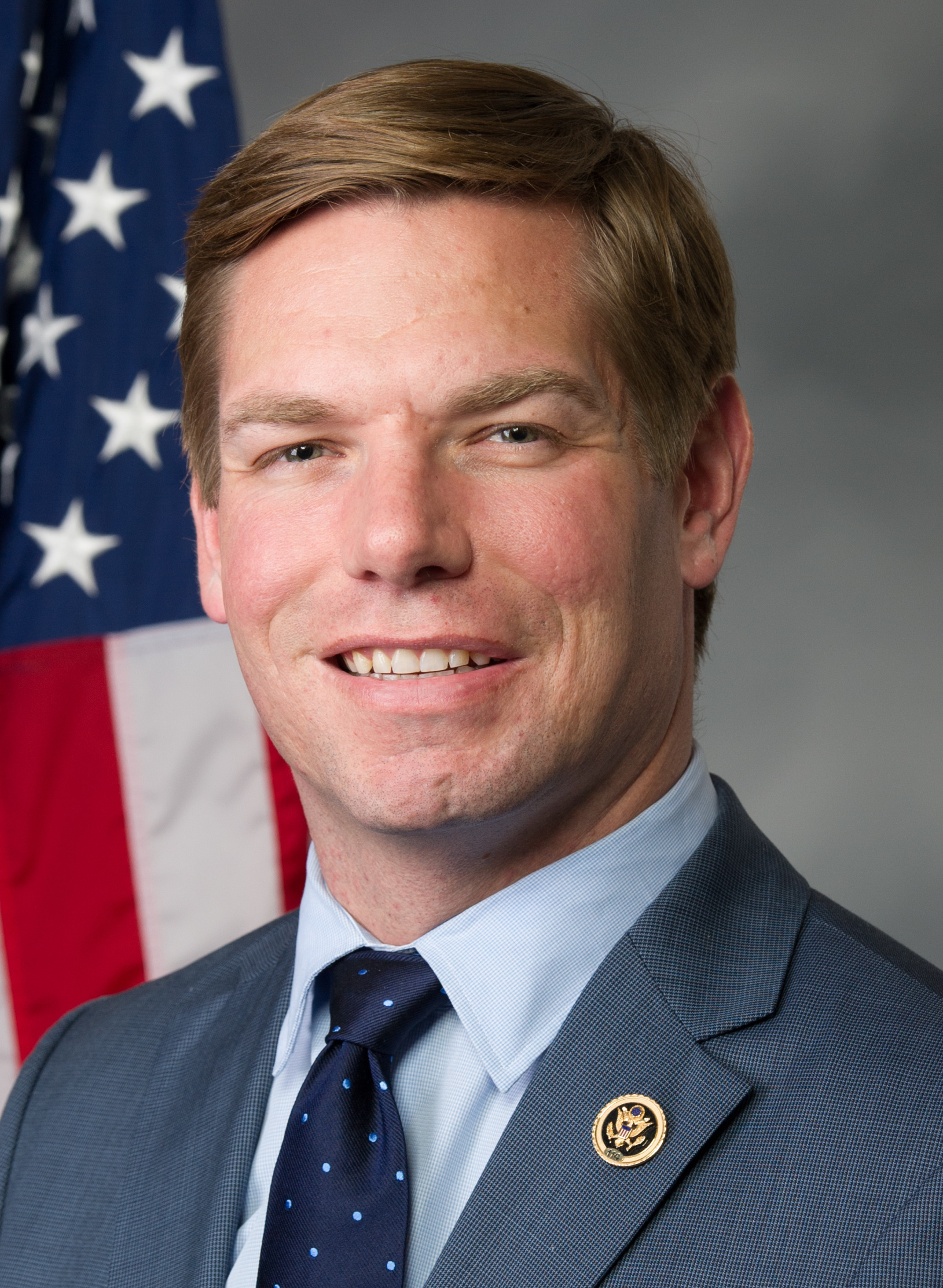
Eric Swalwell

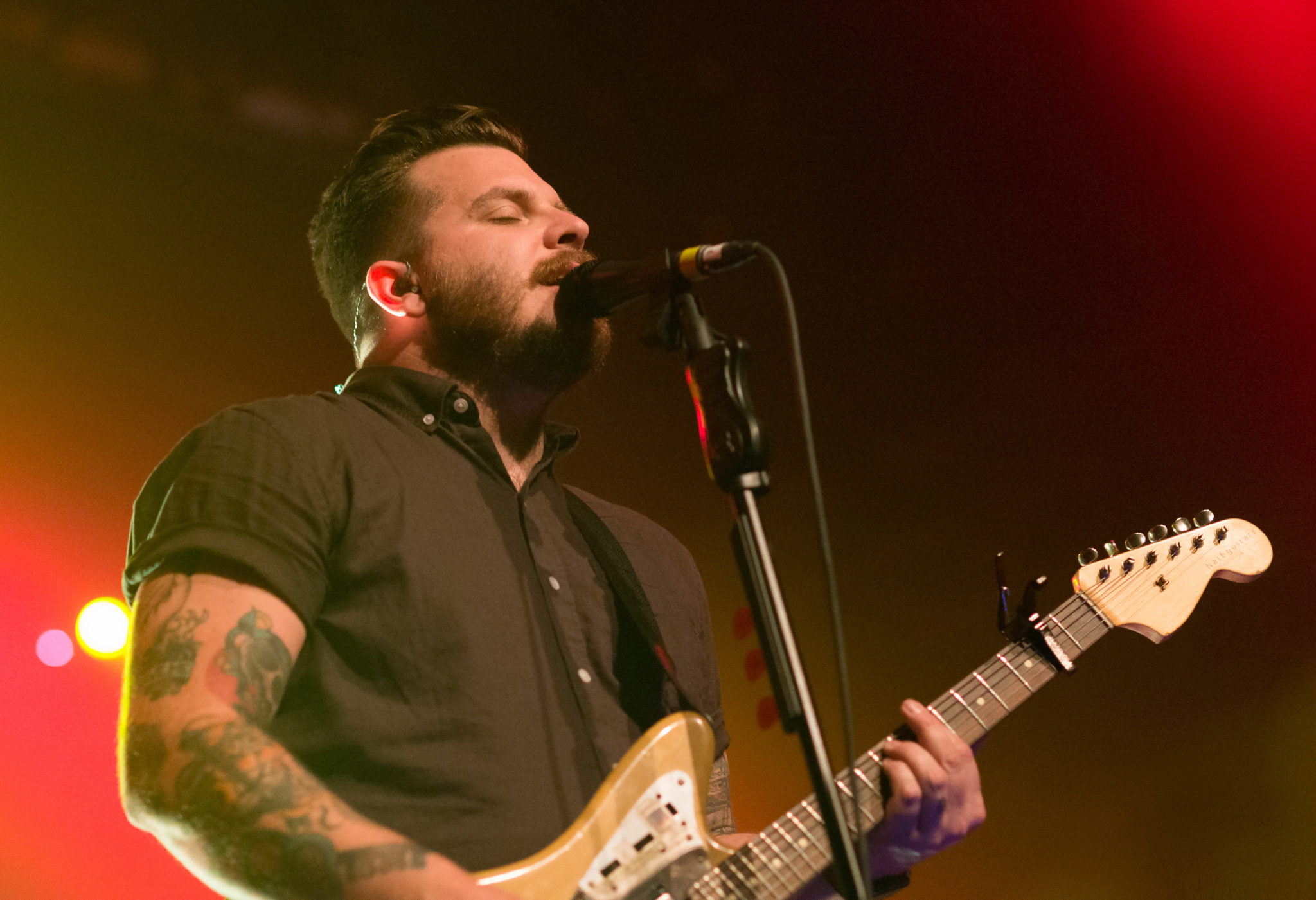
Dustin Kensrue

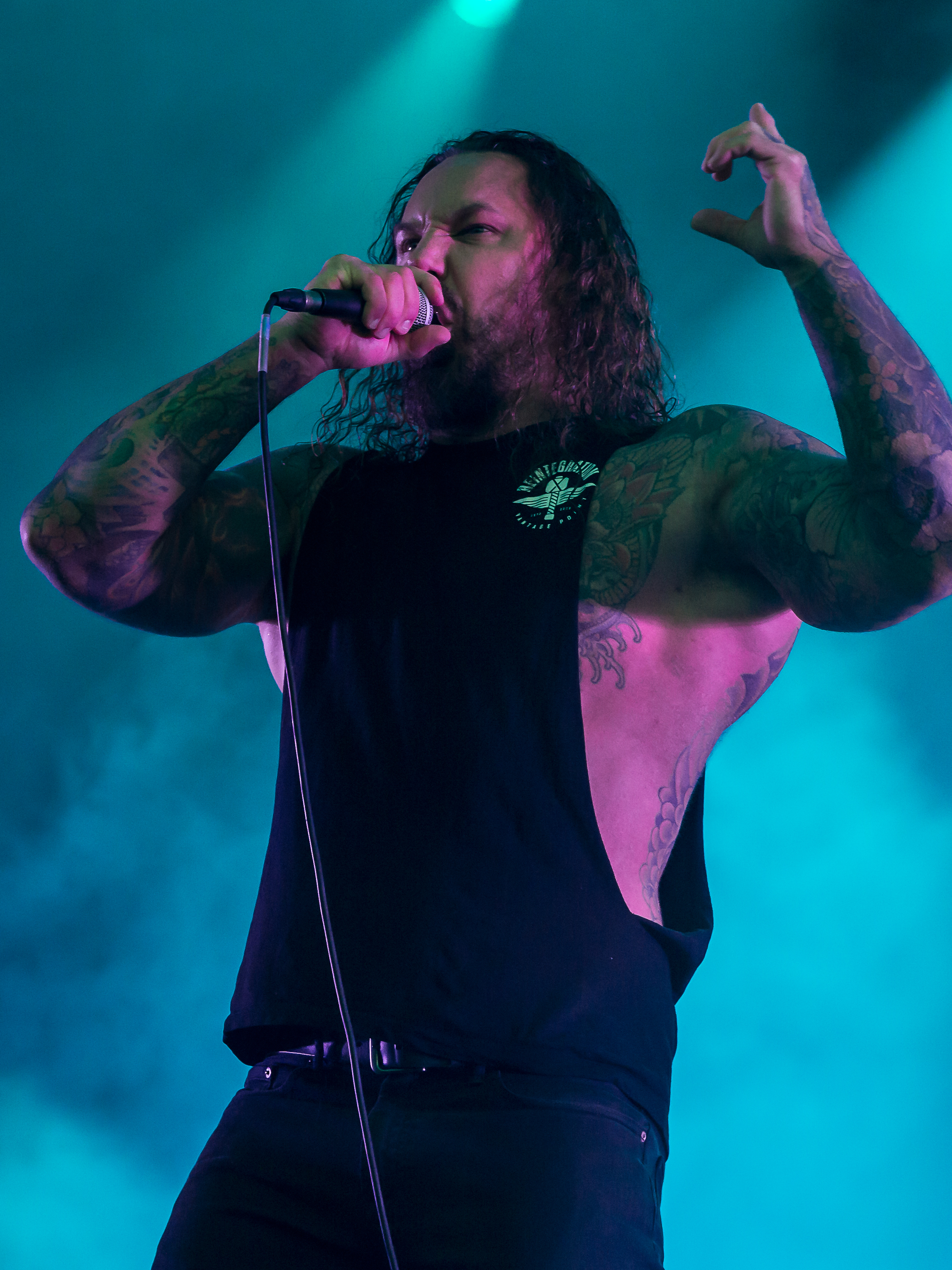
Tim Lambesis

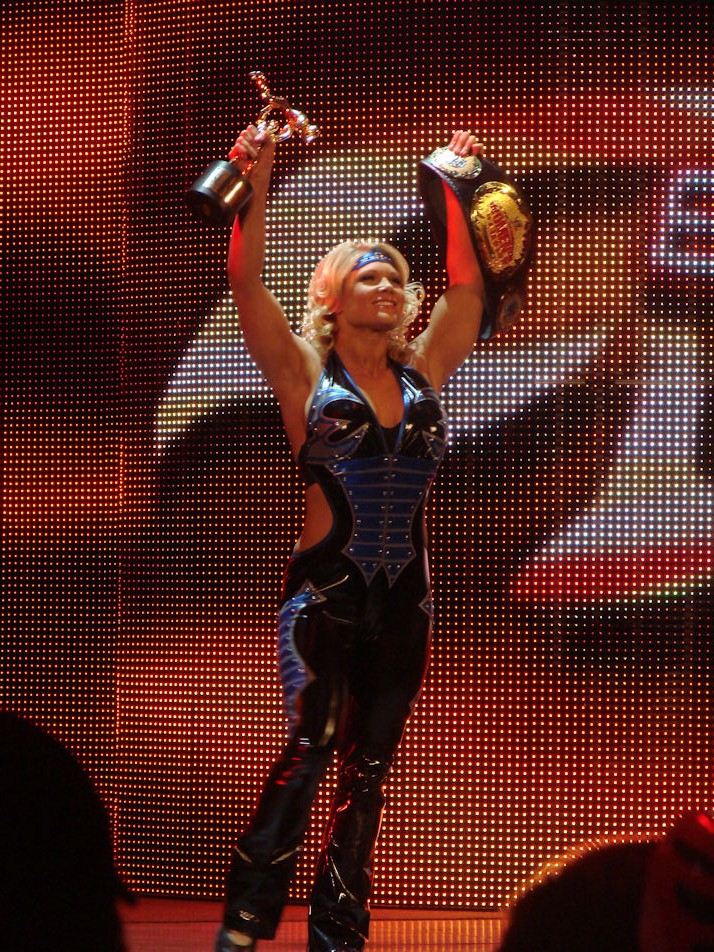
Beth Phoenix

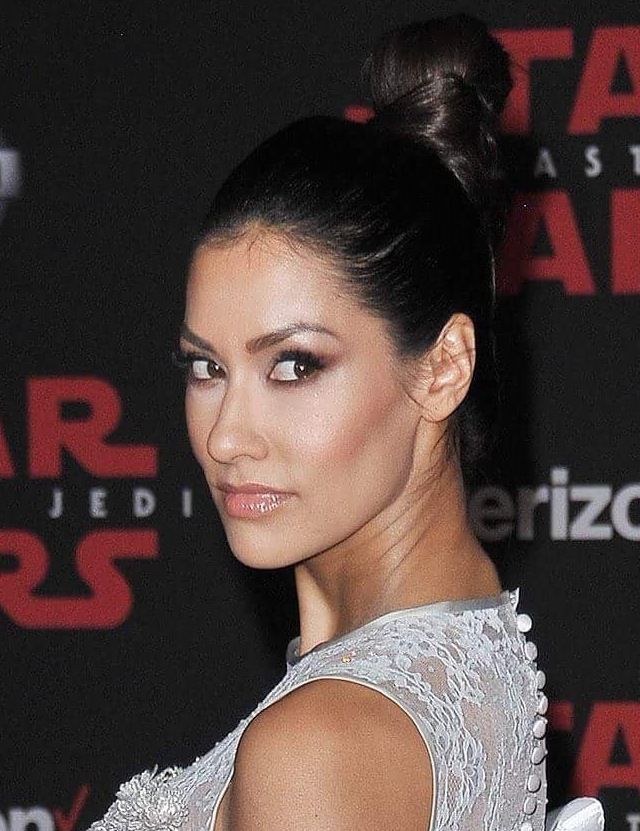
Janina Gavankar

- November 2
  - Karamo Brown, television personality and culture coach
  - Barbara Buffaloe, politician, mayor of Columbia, Missouri
- November 3 – Dan Marsala, singer and frontman for Story of the Year
- November 4
  - Morgan Babst, author
  - Wes Burton, stock car racing driver
  - George Huff, singer
  - Laura Stylez, radio personality
- November 5 – James Burchett, politician
- November 6 – Brad Baker, baseball player
- November 7
  - Shea Arender, symphony producer, entrepreneur, Broadway producer, and CEO/owner of Las Vegas Symphony Orchestra
  - Shannon Bahrke, Olympic freestyle skier and entrepreneur
  - Miles Bonny, record producer, singer/songwriter, trumpeter, and DJ
  - Timothy Brindle, Christian hip hop lyricist
- November 9 – Vanessa Lachey, model
- November 10
  - Troy Bell, basketball player
  - Susan Bush, soccer player
  - Donté Stallworth, American football player
- November 11
  - Louis Blessing, politician
  - Nicole Malliotakis, politician
  - Willie Parker, football player
- November 12
  - Trent Acid, wrestler (d. 2010)
  - Meghan Allen, model and television personality
  - McKinley Bailey, politician
  - Franck Bohbot, photographer
  - Lance Briggs, football player
- November 13
  - Josh Blankenship, football player and coach
  - Monique Coleman, actress
  - Sara Del Ray, wrestler
- November 14
  - Randall Bal, swimmer
  - Allison Bradshaw, tennis player
  - Open Mike Eagle, rapper and comedian
  - Ben Harper, guitarist for Yellowcard (1997–2005), Amber Pacific (2006), and HeyMike!
- November 15 – Ace Young, singer/songwriter and actor
- November 16
  - Kayte Christensen, basketball player
  - Josh A. Moore, basketball player
  - Eric Swalwell, politician
  - Susan Kelechi Watson, actress
- November 17
  - Jay Bradley, wrestler
  - Isaac Hanson, guitarist and singer for Hanson
- November 18
  - Denny Hamlin, race car driver
  - Dustin Kensrue, singer/songwriter, guitarist, and frontman for Thrice
- November 19
  - Courtney Anderson, football player
  - Jamison Brewer, basketball player
  - Nick Browne, football player
- November 20
  - Richard Alston, football player
  - Crystal Anthony, cyclo-cross cyclist
- November 21
  - Hank Blalock, baseball player
  - Alec Brownstein, creative marketer, book author, and director
  - Tim Lambesis, singer and frontman for As I Lay Dying
  - Derek Youngsma, drummer for Bleeding Through
- November 22
  - Tim Anderson, football player
  - Shawn Fanning, computer programmer, entrepreneur, investor, and co-founder of Napster
- November 23
  - David Britz, scientist and engineer
  - Jonathan Papelbon, baseball player
- November 24
  - Brandon Hunter, basketball player (d. 2023)
  - Beth Phoenix, wrestler
- November 25
  - Valerie Azlynn, actress
  - John-Michael Liles, hockey player
  - Nick Swisher, baseball player
- November 26 – Jessica Bowman, actress
- November 28
  - Bea Bielik, tennis player
  - Angelica Ross, actress and businesswoman
- November 29
  - Jiggly Caliente, Filipino-born drag performer and entertainer (d. 2025)
  - Janina Gavankar, actress and musician
  - Jason Griffith, actor and voice actor
- November 30
  - Guerin Austin, television host, model, and beauty queen
  - Jimmy Baxter, American-born Jordanian basketball player
  - Shane Victorino, baseball player

=== December ===
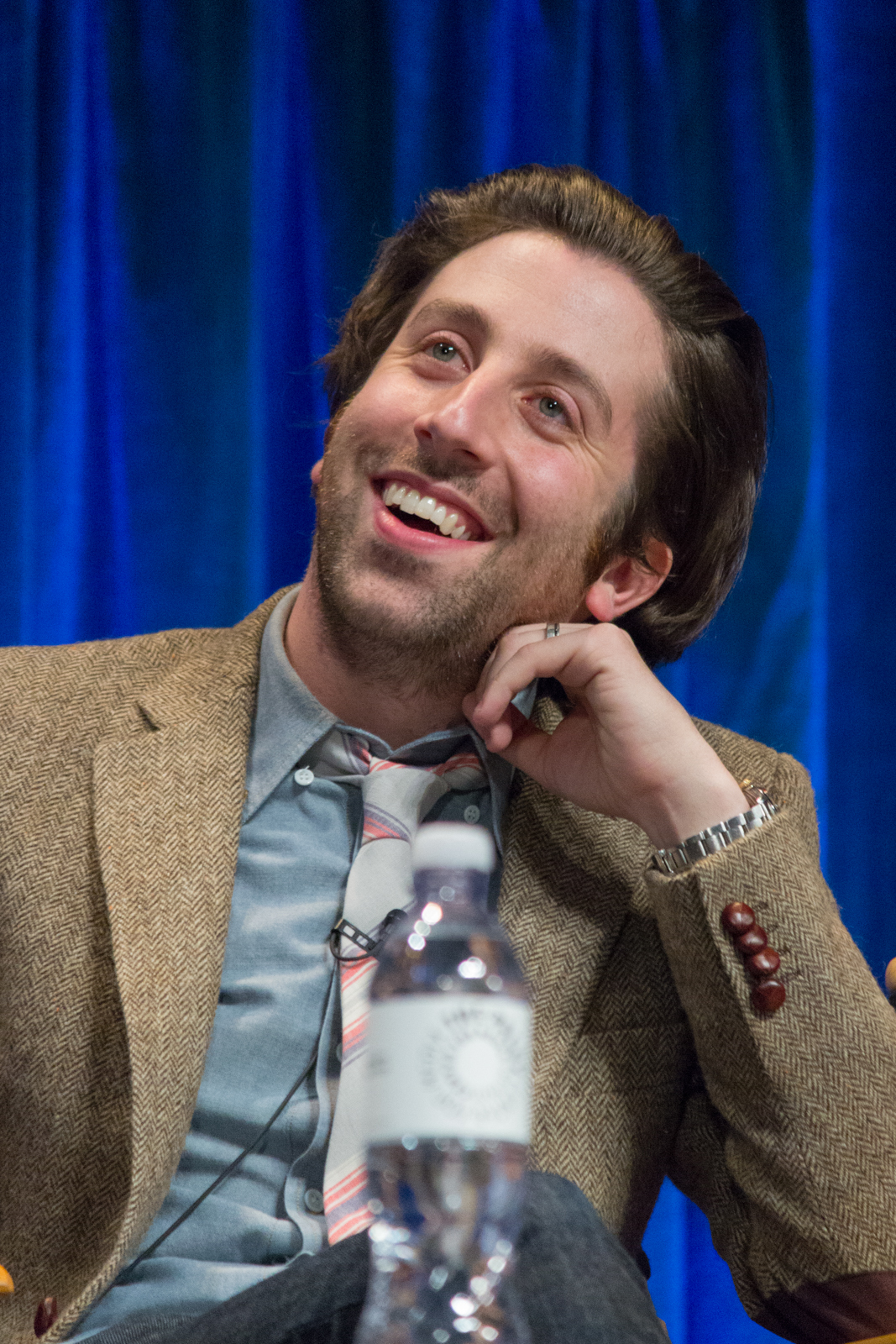
Simon Helberg

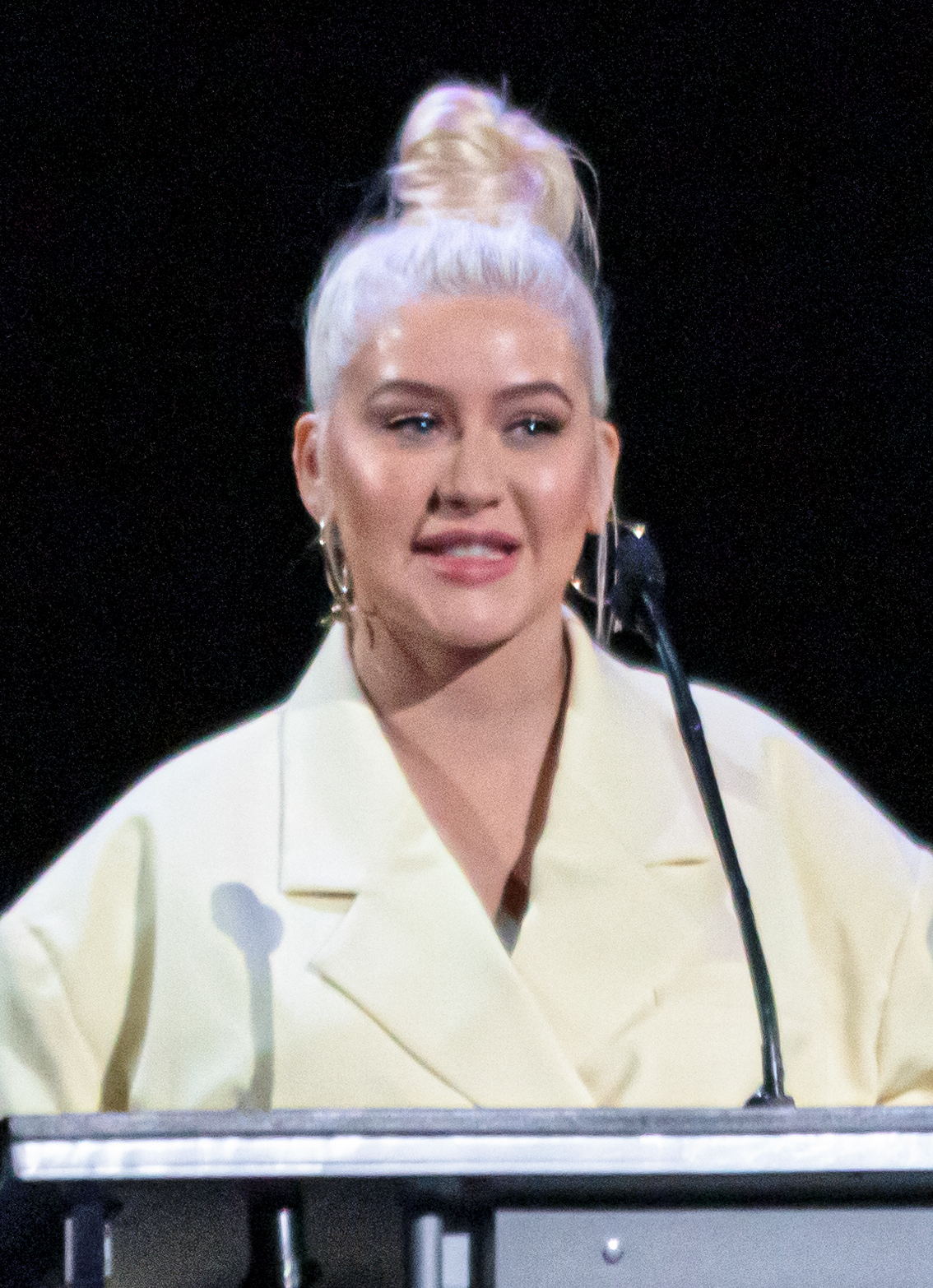
Christina Aguilera

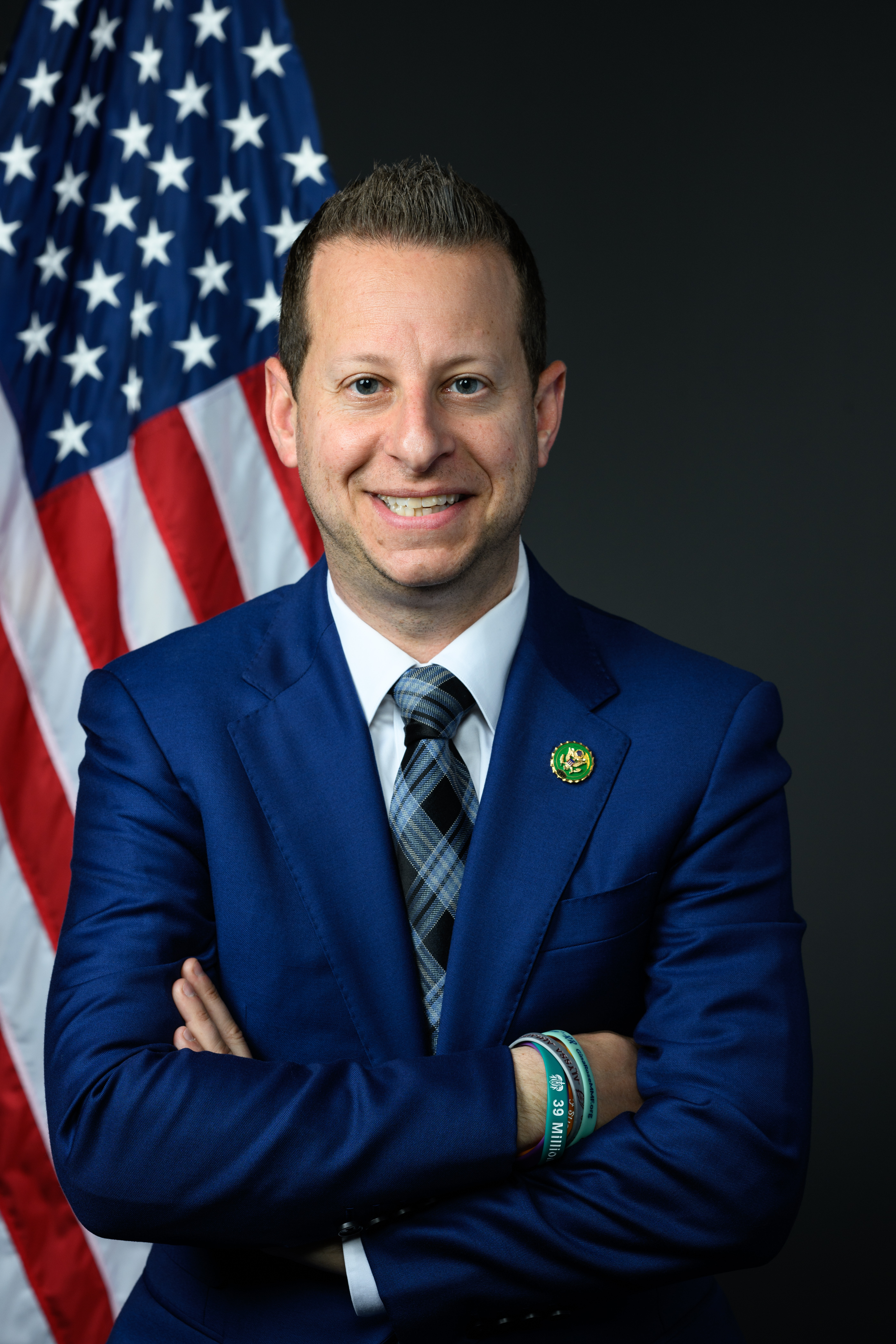
Jared Moskowitz

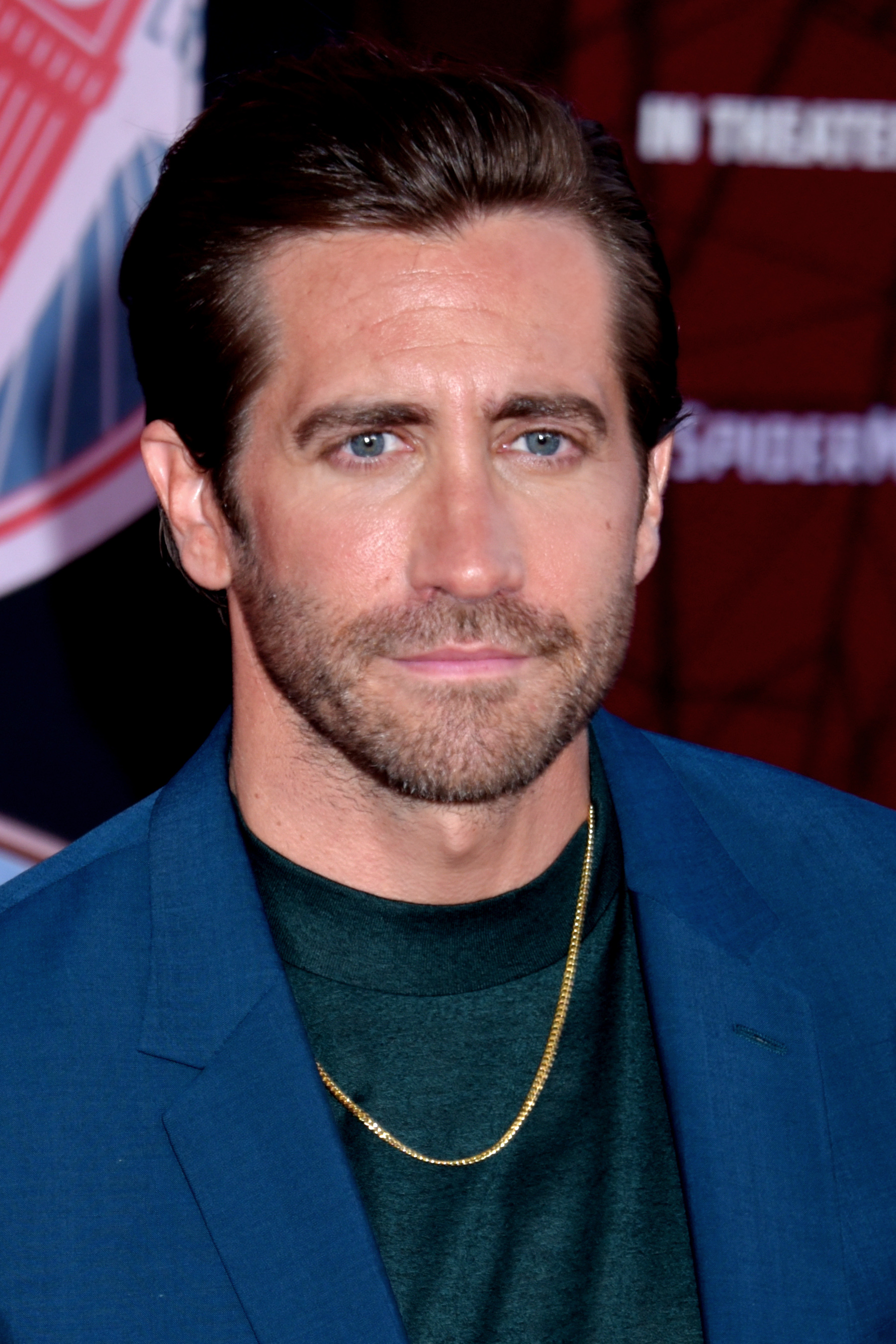
Jake Gyllenhaal

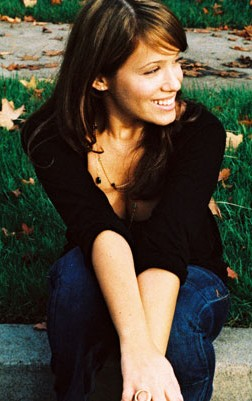
Marla Sokoloff

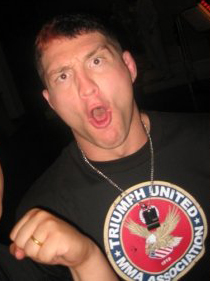
Jason "Mayhem" Miller

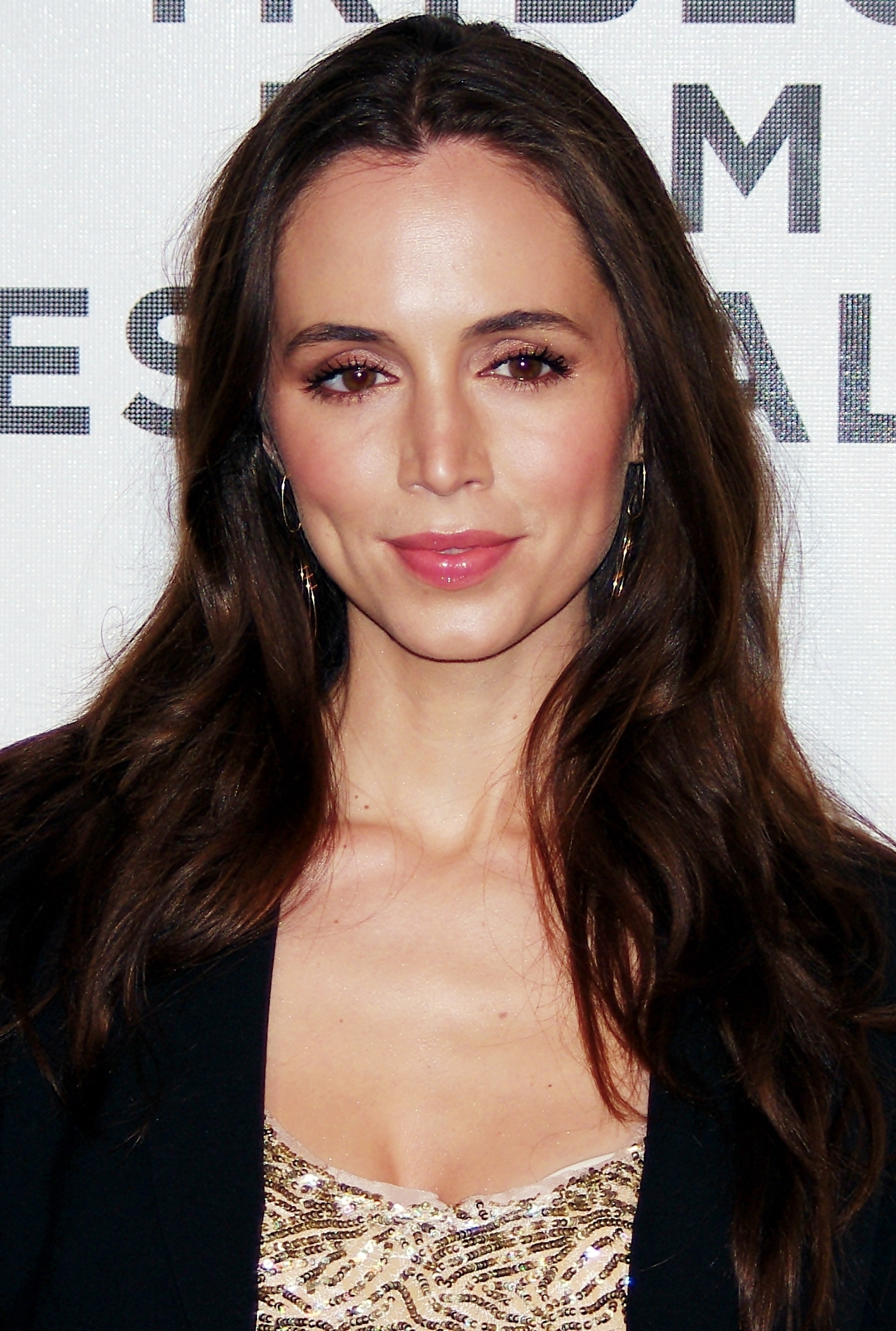
Eliza Dushku

- December 1 – Angelique Bates, actress, comedian, and rapper
- December 2
  - Jona Bechtolt, electronic musician and multimedia artist
  - Mario Bokara, wrestler
- December 3
  - Anna Chlumsky, actress
  - Jenna Dewan, actress and dancer
  - Jim Sorgi, football player
- December 7 – Dan Bilzerian, poker player, businessman, and social media influencer
- December 8
  - Juliette Danielle, actress
  - Lisa Kelly, reality star and truck driver
  - Will Long, artist and musician
- December 9
  - Simon Helberg, actor, comedian and musician
  - Bárbara Padilla, Mexican-born opera singer
- December 10
  - Sarah Chang, violinist
  - Kate Reinders, actress and singer
- December 11
  - Joe Blanton, baseball player
  - Matías Boeker, tennis player
- December 12 – Donny Boaz, actor
- December 13
  - Alan Alborn, Olympic ski jumper
  - Nathalia Holt, author
- December 14 – Sam Aiken, football player
- December 15
  - Bobby Bradley, baseball player
  - Crosby Loggins, singer/songwriter, son of Kenny Loggins
  - Spike Mendelsohn, chef and restauranteur
- December 16
  - Kristen Arnett, author
  - Greg Brooks, football player
  - Holly Merrill Raschein, politician
  - Stuart Schuffman, travel writer
- December 18
  - Christina Aguilera, singer/songwriter, actress and television personality
  - Jared Moskowitz, politician
  - D. J. Trahan, golfer
  - Baron Vaughn, actor and comedian
- December 19
  - Derek Abney, football player
  - Gregory Douglass, singer/songwriter
  - Jake Gyllenhaal, actor
  - Eddie Jackson, chef and football player
  - Hunter Johnson, wrestler
  - Marla Sokoloff, actress
- December 21
  - Nicholas William Bailey, composer and songwriter
  - SirValiant Brown, basketball player
  - J. P. Reese, mixed martial artist
  - Royce Ring, baseball player
- December 22
  - Chris Carmack, actor
  - Derek Tran, politician
- December 23
  - Yadira Caraveo, politician
  - Rory O'Malley, actor and gay rights activist
  - Cody Ross, baseball player
- December 24
  - Benjamin Barger, Olympic windsurfer
  - Dutch Boyd, poker player
  - Tony Dokoupil, journalist
  - Jason "Mayhem" Miller, mixed martial artist and television host
- December 27
  - Bernard Berrian, football player
  - Elizabeth Rodriguez, actress
- December 30
  - Chalise Baysa, American-born Filipino football player and manager
  - Eliza Dushku, actress and model
  - Tommy Giles Rogers Jr., singer, keyboardist, and frontman for Between the Buried and Me
  - Scott Haze, actor
- December 31 – Matt Cross, wrestler

=== Full date unknown ===
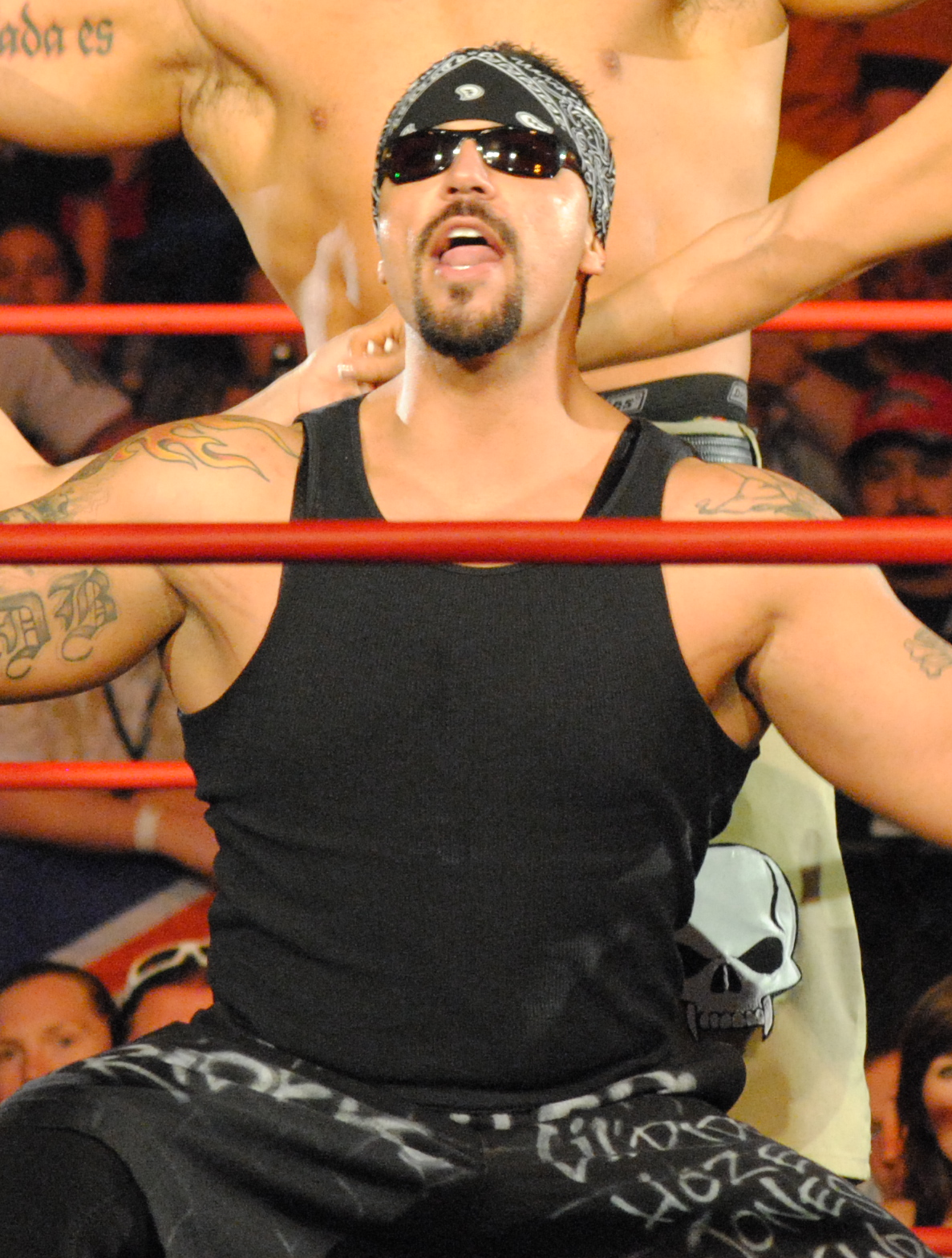
Anarquia

- Zainab Ahmad, lawyer
- Indira Allegra, artist and writer
- Dmitri Alperovitch, Russian-born computer security industry executive, co-founder and former chief technology officer of CrowdStrike
- César Alvarez, composer, lyricist, and playwright
- Emilie Amundson, educator and government administrator
- Anarquia, wrestler
- Joanna Angel, pornographic and mainstream actress, director, and adult film writer
- David Armand, writer and author
- Sam Ashworth, songwriter, producer, and recording artist
- Erica Baker, engineer and Chief Technology Officer for the DCCC
- Jimmy Baker, artist and professor
- Kelly J. Baker, writer
- Emily Balskus, chemical biologist, enzymologist, microbiologist, and biochemist
- J. Campbell Barker, judge
- Michel Barrera, wanted fugitive
- Joe Bartholdi Jr., poker player
- Travis Beacham, screenwriter
- Ryan Berman, politician
- James S. Bielo, socio-cultural anthropologist
- Christophe Bisciglia, entrepreneur
- Leydy Bonilla, bachata singer
- David Tai Bornoff, writer, advertising creative director, photographer, film director, and multimedia artist
- Martha Bowen, swimmer
- Thomas Bradshaw, playwright
- Josh Brand, artist
- Marie Brennan, fantasy author
- Steve Brinster, disc golfer
- Dan Bronoske, politician
- Adrien Broom, art photographer
- Aaron Brown, Australian-born violinist, composer, and teacher
- Box Brown, cartoonist
- Jesse Brune, chef, personal trainer and lifestyle coach
- Caleb Burhans, composer, singer, and multi-instrumentalist
- Gregory Burks, basketball player
- Justin Busch, politician
- Joanna Calo, director, writer, and producer
- Lilly McElroy, photographer
- Sarah Sokolovic, actress

== Deaths ==
=== January ===
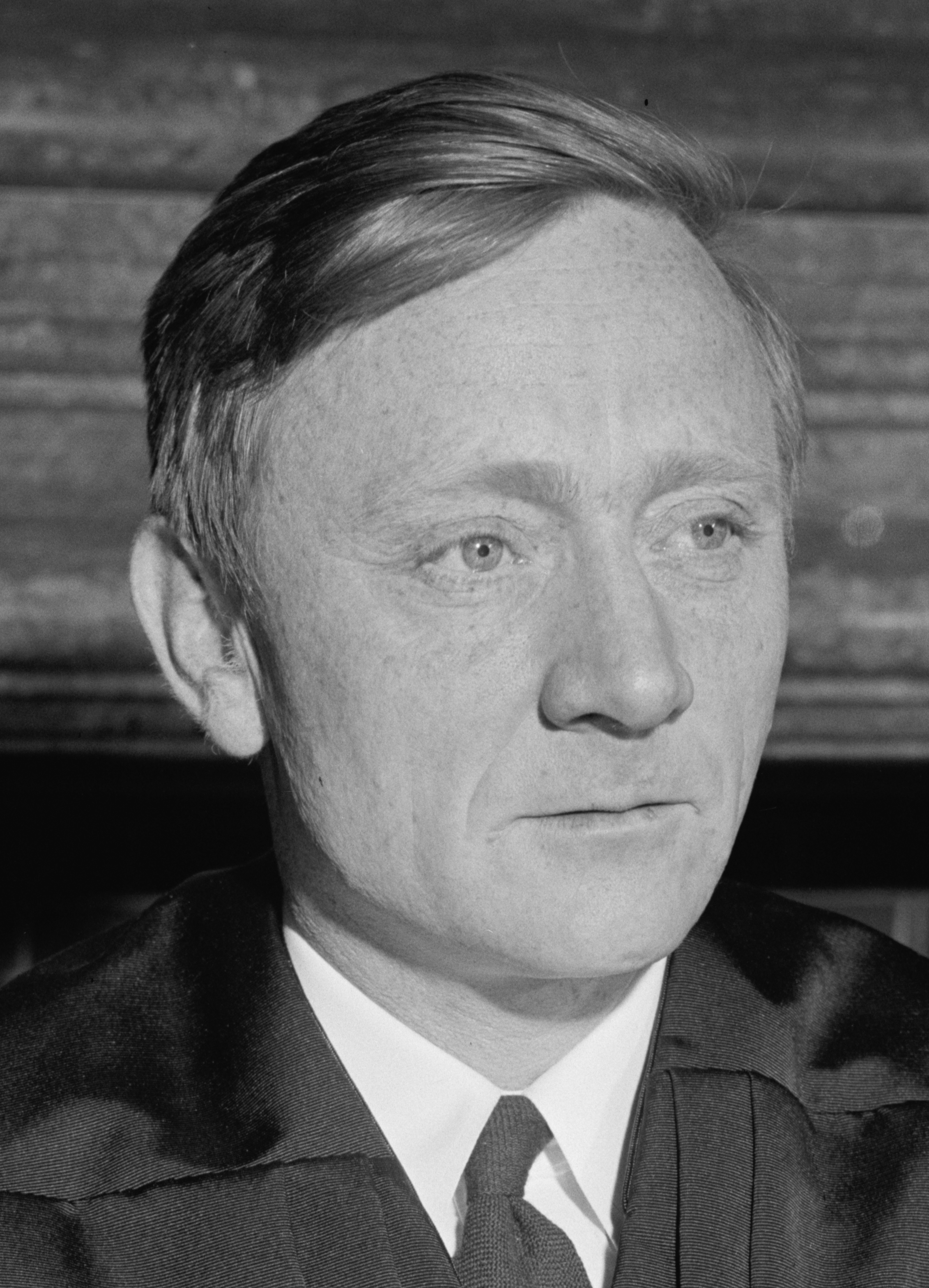
William O. Douglas

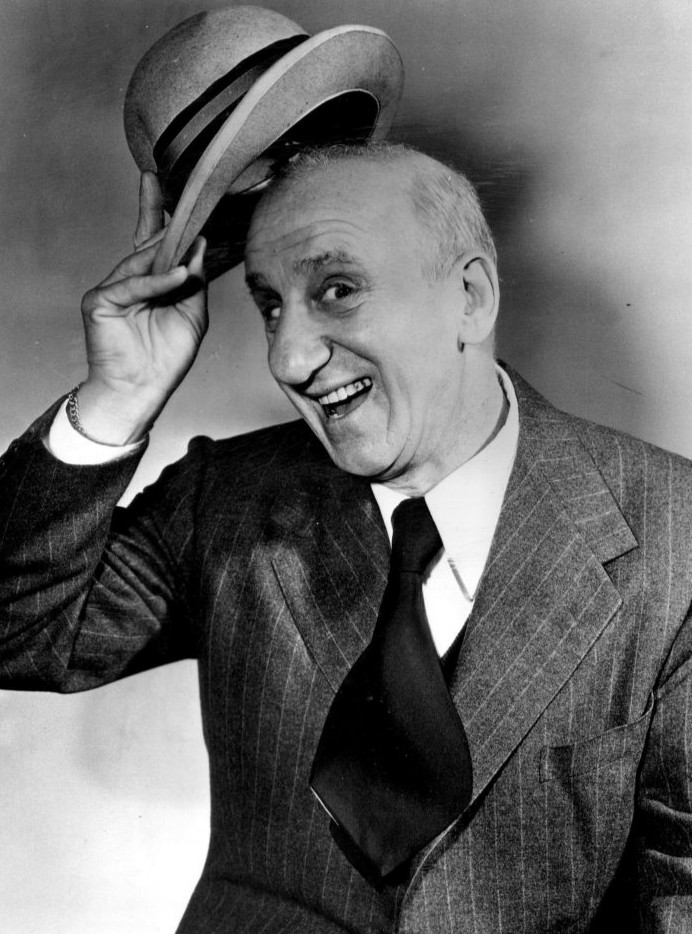
Jimmy Durante

- January 1 – Frank Wykoff, relay sprinter (b. 1909)
- January 6 – Georgeanna Tillman, singer, member of The Marvelettes (born 1944)
- January 8 – John Mauchly, physicist and inventor (born 1907)
- January 10
  - Hughie Critz, baseball player and scout (born 1900)
  - George Meany, plumber and trade union leader (born 1894)
  - Bo Rein, American football player and coach (b. 1945)
- January 17 – Barbara Britton, actress (born 1919)
- January 19 – William O. Douglas, Supreme Court Justice (born 1898)
- January 23 – Leonard Strong, actor (born 1908)
- January 25 – David Newell, actor (born 1905)
- January 29 – Jimmy Durante, actor, singer and comedian (born 1893)
- January 30
  - Professor Longhair, musician (born 1918)
  - Warren Smith, singer and guitarist (born 1932)

=== February ===
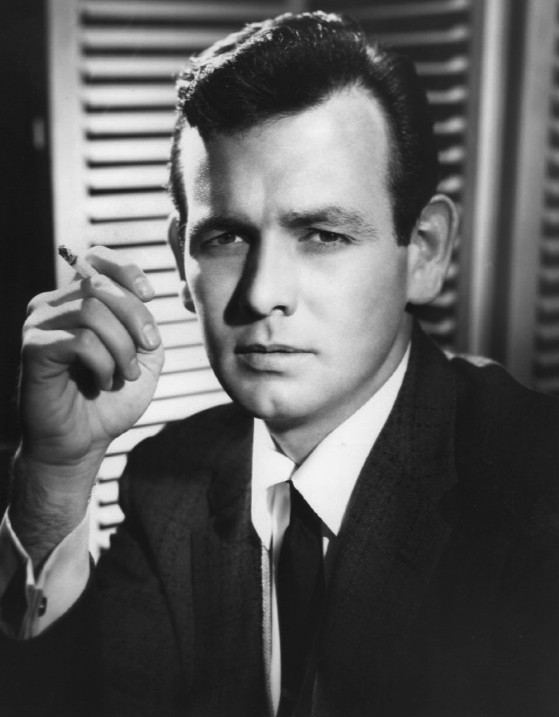
David Janssen

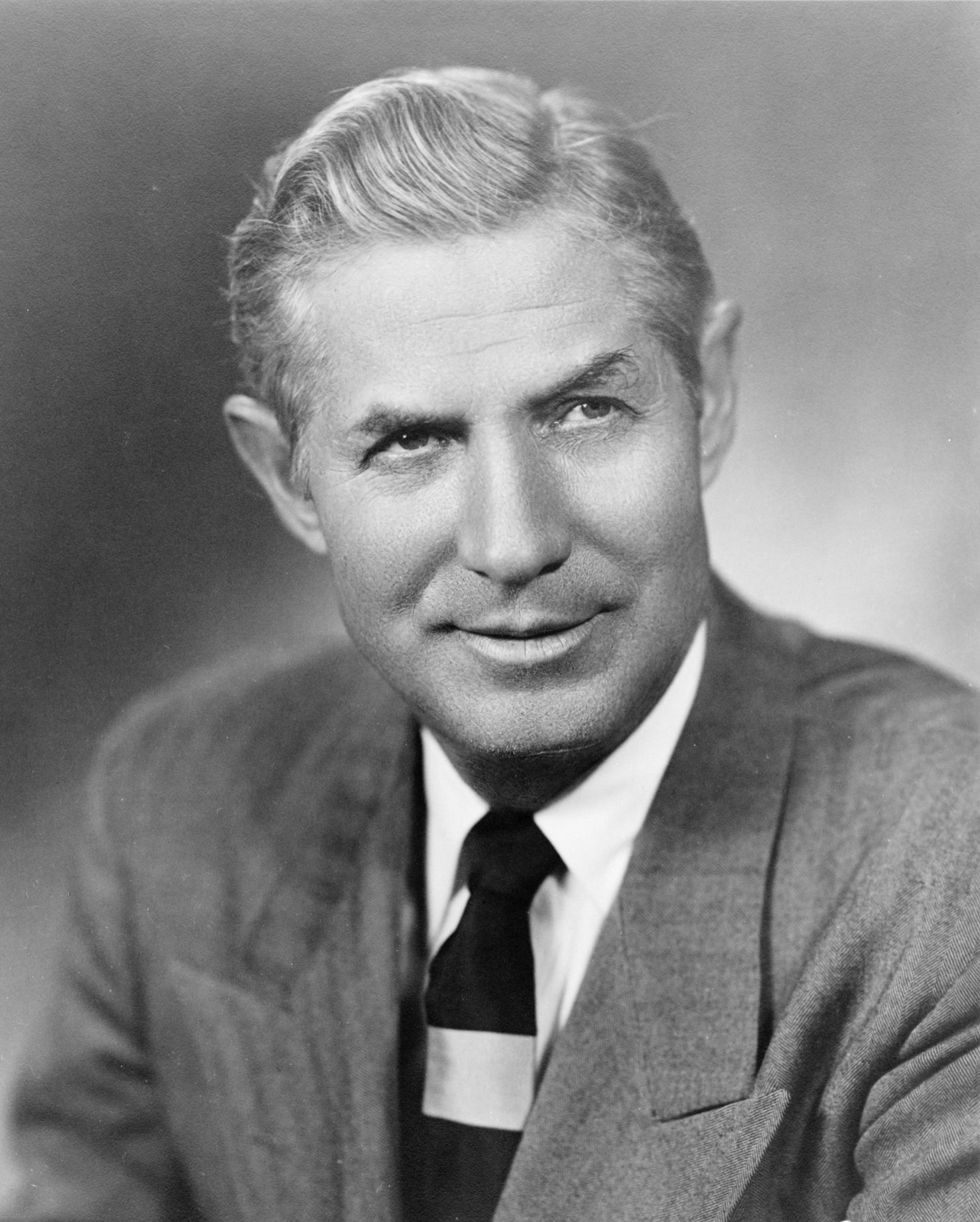
Mike Monroney

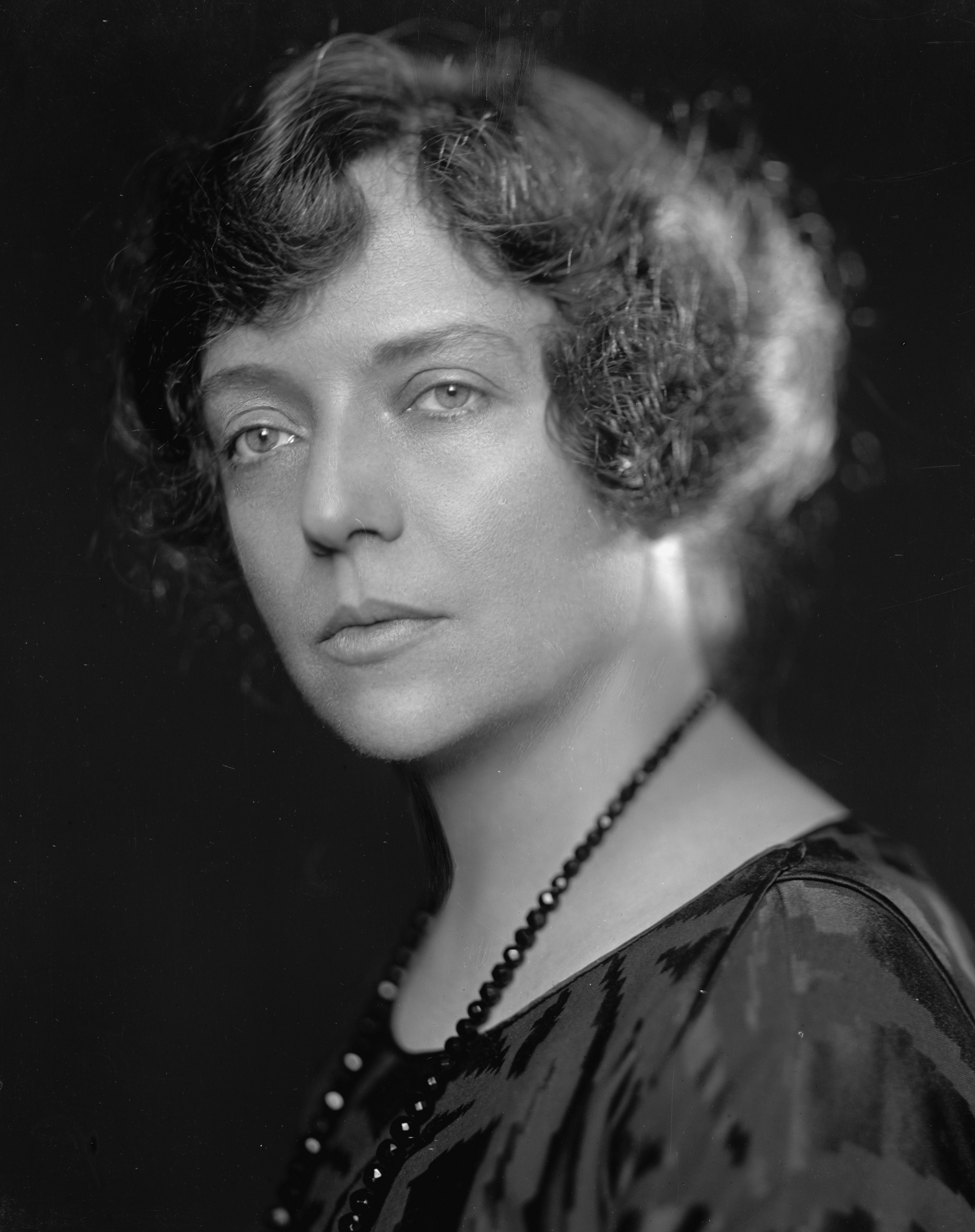
Alice Roosevelt Longworth

- February 1 – Jack Bailey, television host (Queen for a Day) (born 1907)
- February 2 – William Howard Stein, chemist, Nobel Prize laureate (born 1911)
- February 6 – Albert Kotin, abstract expressionist painter (born 1907)
- February 8 – Isadora Bennett, publicity agent (born 1900)
- February 12 – Muriel Rukeyser, poet (born 1913)
- February 13
  - David Janssen, actor (born 1931)
  - Mike Monroney, U.S. Senator from Oklahoma from 1951 to 1969 (born 1902)
- February 17 – Jerry Fielding, conductor and music director (born 1922)
- February 18 – Gale Robbins, singer and actress (born 1921)
- February 19 – Jason Lee, politician and judge (born 1915)
- February 20
  - Joseph Banks Rhine, parapsychologist (born 1895)
  - Alice Roosevelt Longworth, youngest daughter of Theodore Roosevelt (born 1884)
- February 23 – Robert Hayden, poet and essayist, first African-American Poet Laureate (born 1913)
- February 27 – George Tobias, actor (born 1901).
- February 28 – James Goff, American football and basketball head coach (born 1912)
- February 29 – Gil Elvgren, pin-up artist (born 1914)

=== March ===
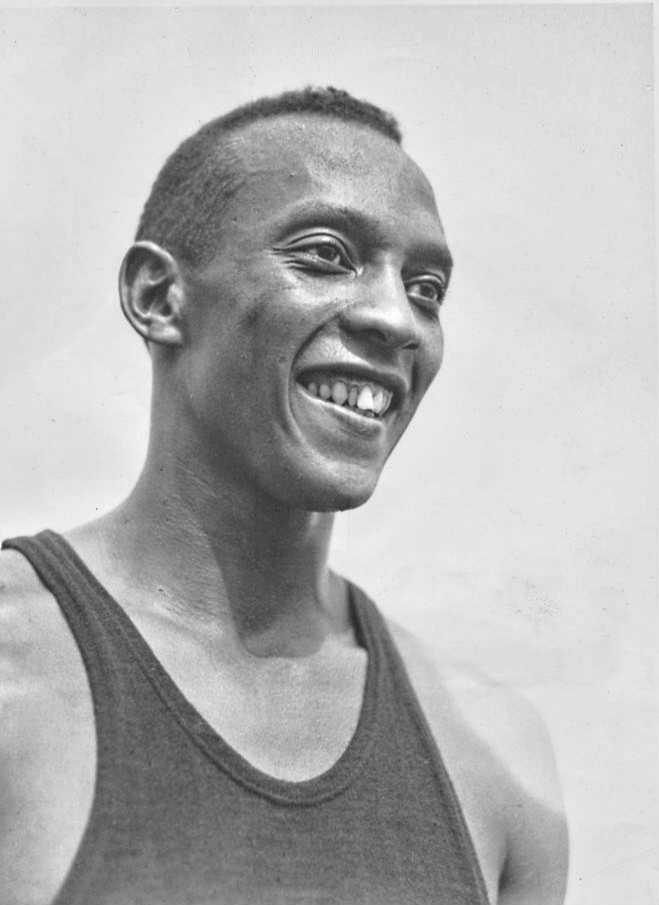
Jesse Owens

- March 3 – Roger Davis, actor (born 1884)
- March 5 – Jay Silverheels, Indigenous Canadian actor and athlete (b. 1912)
- March 10 – Herman Tarnower, medical doctor and diet guru (born 1910; murdered)
- March 11 – Maud Hart Lovelace, author (born 1892)
- March 18 – Jessica Dragonette, singer (born 1900)
- March 21 – Peter Stoner, mathematician, astronomer and Christian apologist (born 1888)
- March 25
  - James Wright, poet (born 1927)
  - Milton H. Erickson, psychiatrist (born 1901)
- March 28 – James Hayes, American-born Filipino Roman Catholic, Jesuit archbishop, missionary and servant of God (born 1889)
- March 30 – David Sharpe, actor (born 1910)
- March 31 – Jesse Owens, track and field athlete (born 1913)

=== April ===
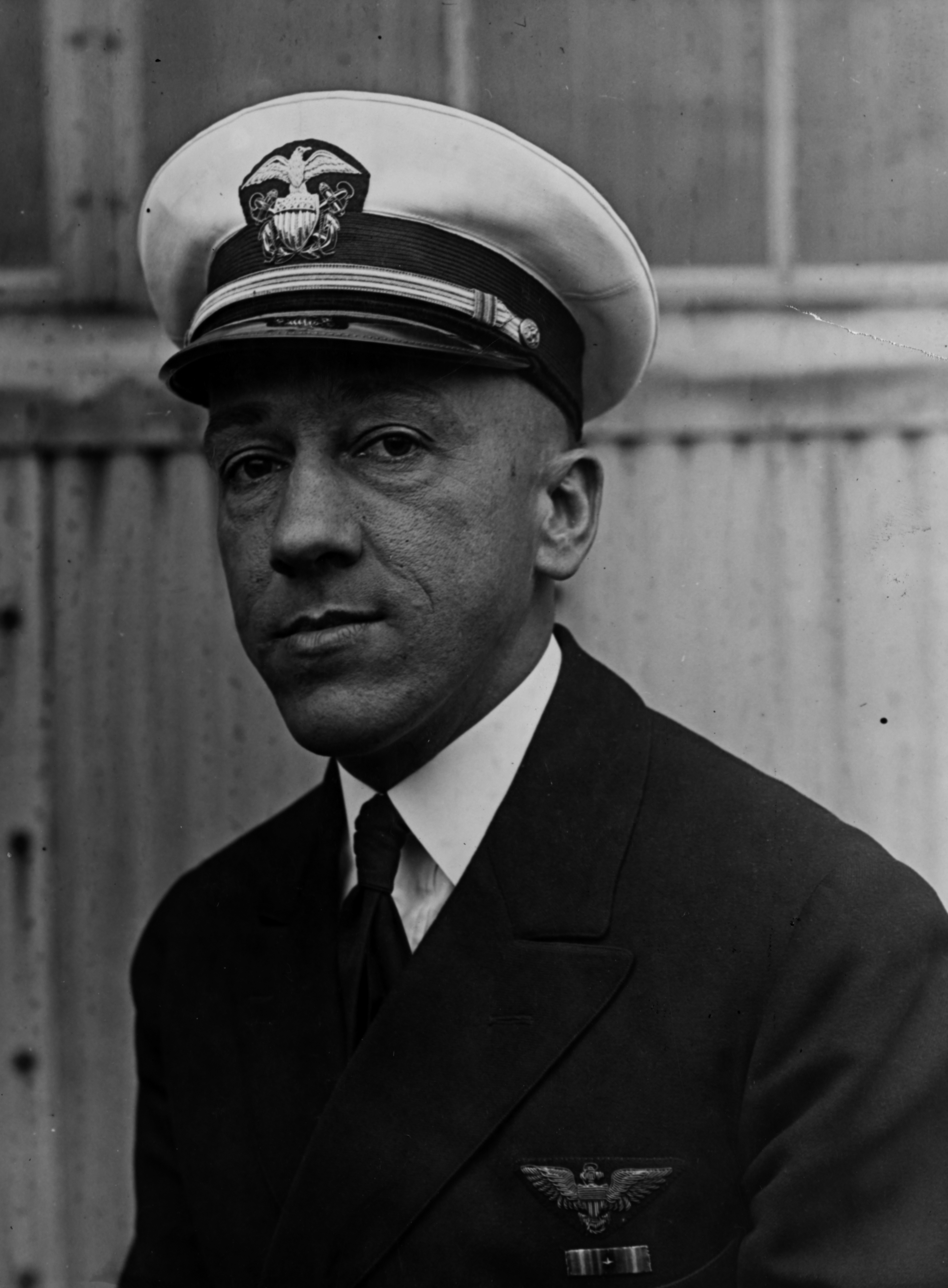
Thomas G. W. Settle

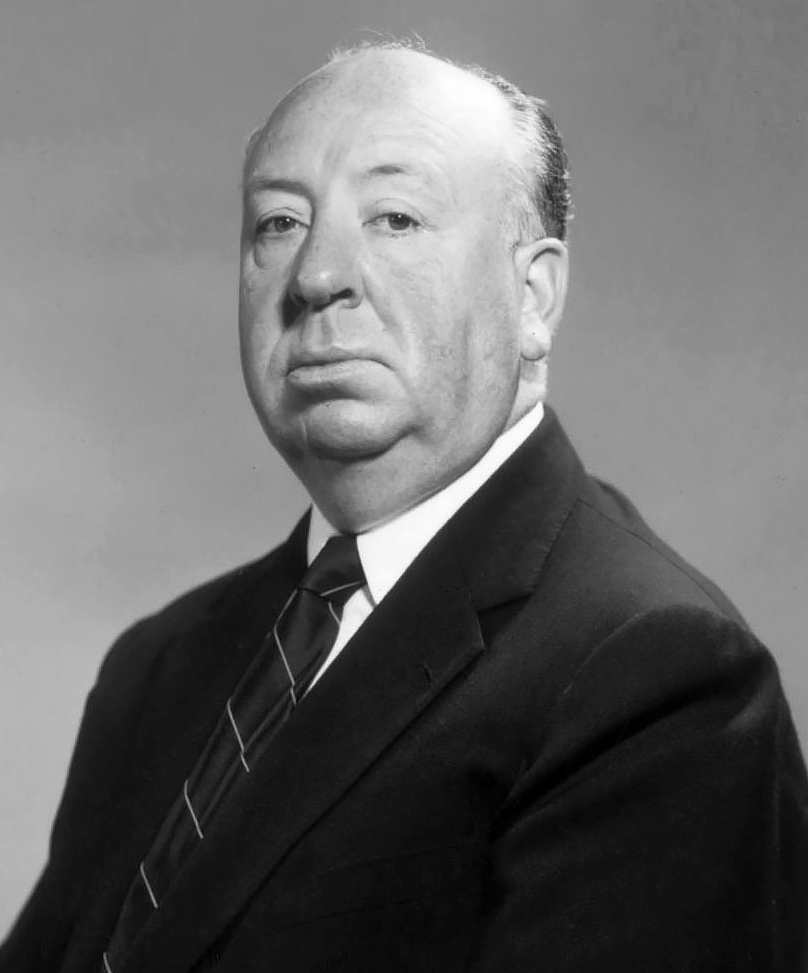
Alfred Hitchcock

- April 2 – Stanley Forman Reed, Supreme Court Justice (born 1884)
- April 4 – Red Sovine, country and folk singer-songwriter (born 1917)
- April 15
  - Raymond Bailey, actor (born 1904)
  - Marshall Reed, film and television actor (born 1917)
- April 18 – Antonio Caponigro, gangster (born 1912)
- April 19 – Charles Seel, actor (born 1897)
- April 20 – Katherine Kennicott Davis, composer (born 1892)
- April 28 – Thomas G. W. Settle, record-setting balloonist and admiral (born 1895)
- April 29 – Alfred Hitchcock, English film director (born 1899)

=== May ===
- May 1 – Henry Levin, film director and actor (born 1909)
- May 2 – George Pal, Hungarian-American animator, film director, and producer (born 1908)
- May 12 – Lillian Roth, actress and singer (born 1910)
- May 30 – Carl Radle, bassist (born 1942)

=== June ===
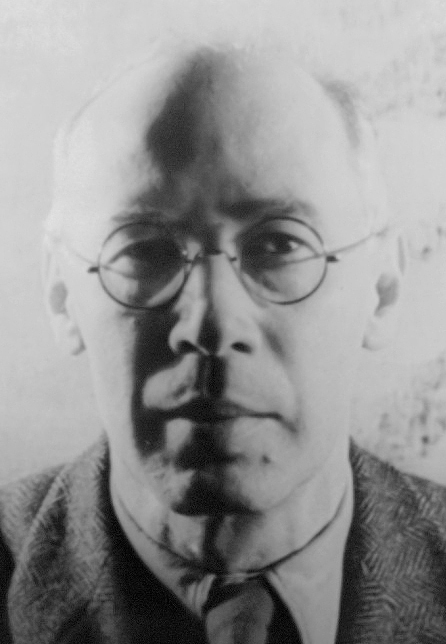
Henry Miller

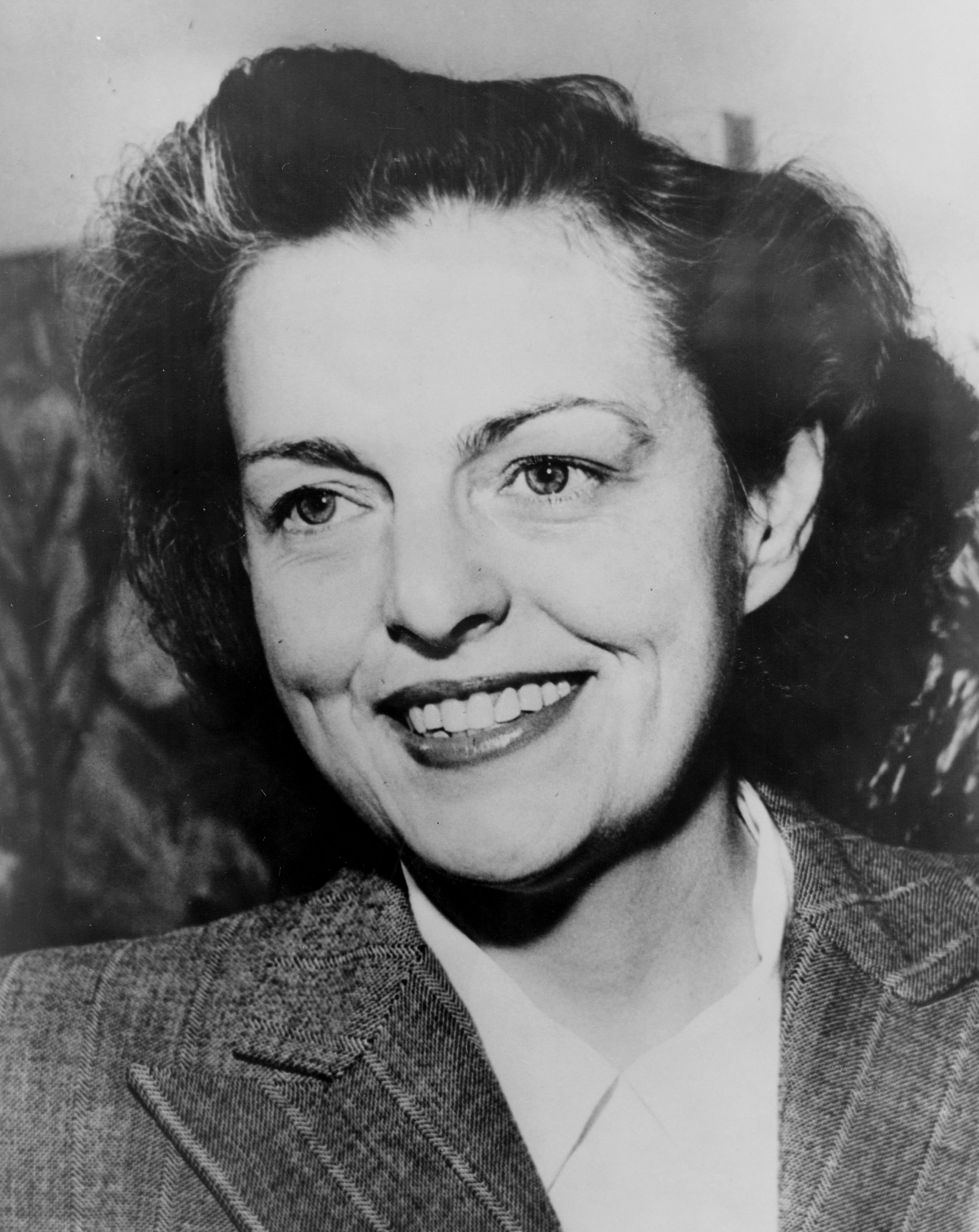
Helen Gahagan Douglas

- June 1
  - Rube Marquard, baseball player and manager (born 1886)
  - Arthur Nielsen, businessman, electrical engineer, and market analyst (born 1897)
- June 4 – Charles Miller, musician (b. 1939)
- June 7
  - Richard Bonelli, operatic baritone (born 1889)
  - Philip Guston, painter (born 1913)
  - Henry Miller, writer (born 1891)
- June 12 – Milburn Stone, actor (born 1904)
- June 23 – Clyfford Still, painter (born 1904)
- June 28
  - Herbie Faye, actor (born 1899)
  - Helen Gahagan, actress and politician (born 1900)
- June 30 – Virginia Brown Faire, actress (born 1904)

=== July ===
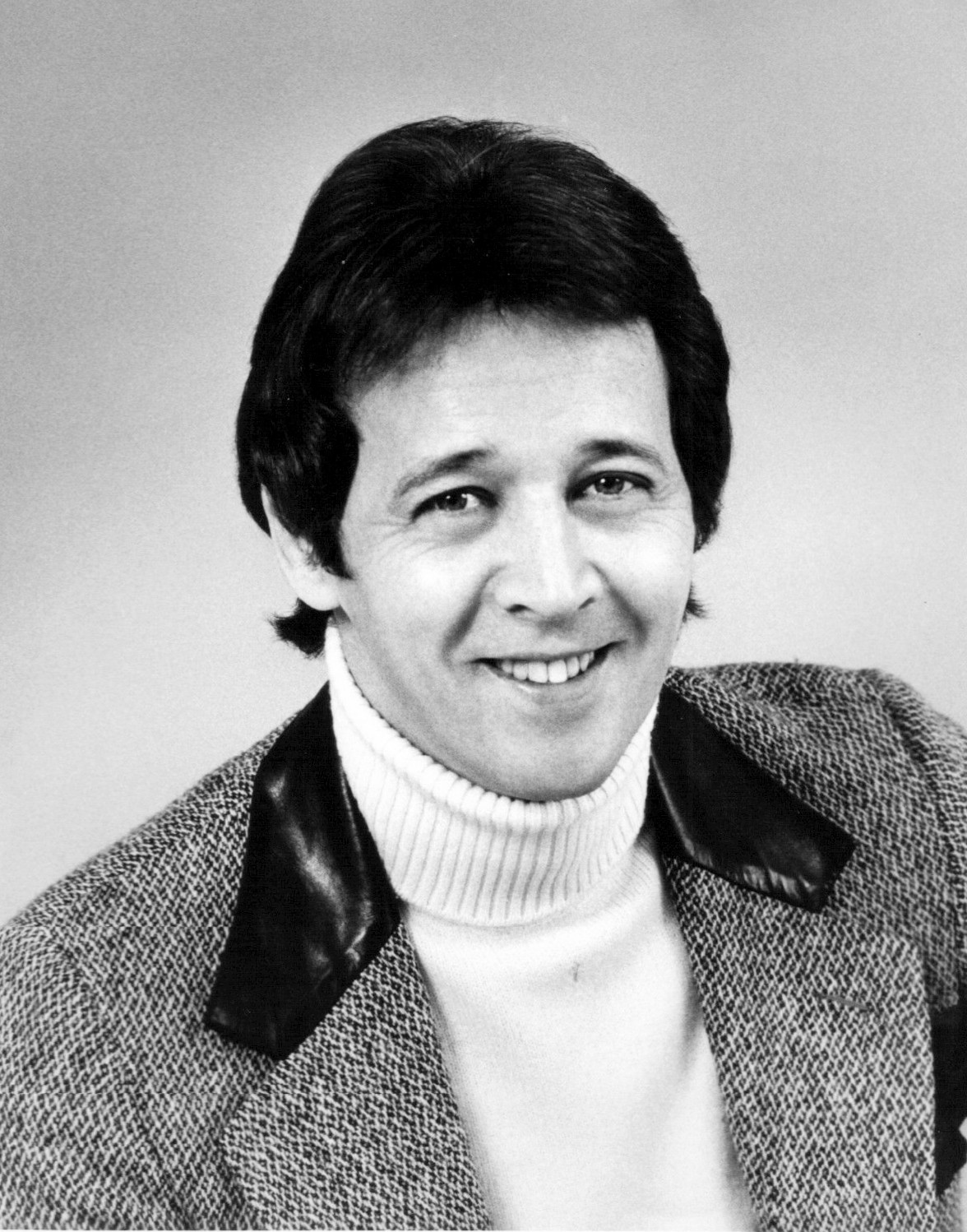
Bobby Van

- July 7
  - Dore Schary, film writer, director and producer (born 1905)
  - Dan White, actor (born 1908)
- July 15 – Ben Selvin, orchestra leader and recording artist (born 1898)
- July 17 – Red Barry, actor (born 1912)
- July 23 – Keith Godchaux, pianist (born 1948)
- July 25 – Tony Catalano, American football player (born 1895)
- July 26 – Allen Hoskins, actor (born 1920)
- July 31 – Bobby Van, actor, singer, and dancer (born 1928)

=== August ===
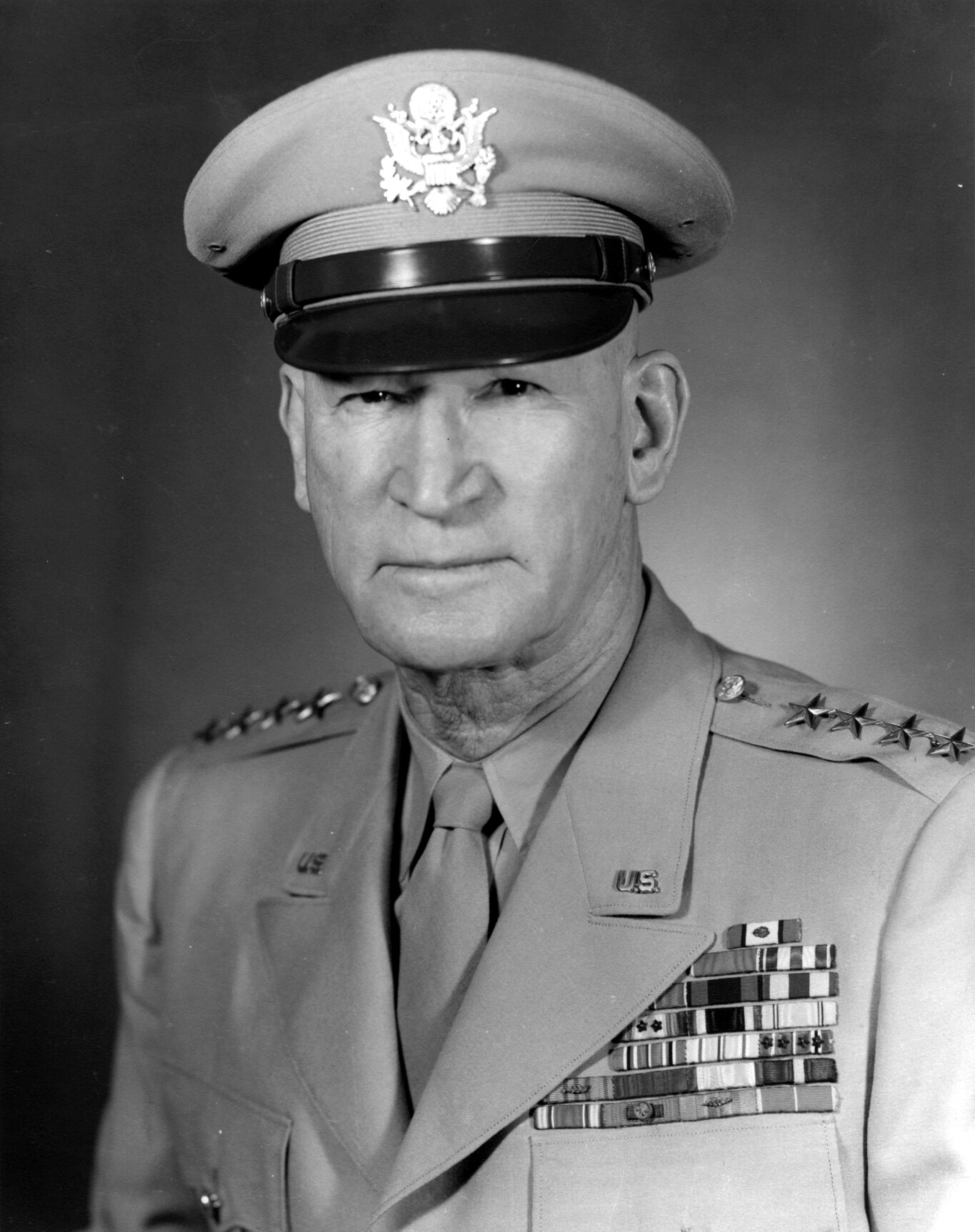
William Hood Simpson

- August 1 – Strother Martin, actor (born 1919)
- August 2
  - Leo Soileau, Cajun musician (born 1904)
  - Donald Ogden Stewart, writer (born 1894)
- August 9
  - Ruby Hurley, civil rights activist (born 1909)
  - Elliott Nugent, actor (born 1896)
- August 14
  - Paul Snider, Canadian murderer, died in Los Angeles, California (born 1951)
  - Dorothy Stratten, Canadian model, actress, and murder victim, died in Los Angeles, California (b. 1960)
- August 15 – William Hood Simpson, general (born 1888)
- August 18 – Fred Beaver, Muscogee Creek-Seminole painter and muralist (born 1911)
- August 25 – Gower Champion, actor, theatre director, choreographer, and dancer (born 1919)
- August 26 –Tex Avery, animator and director (born 1908)
- August 27
  - Douglas Kenney, comedy writer and author (born 1946)
  - Sam Levenson, humorist and author (born 1911)

=== September ===
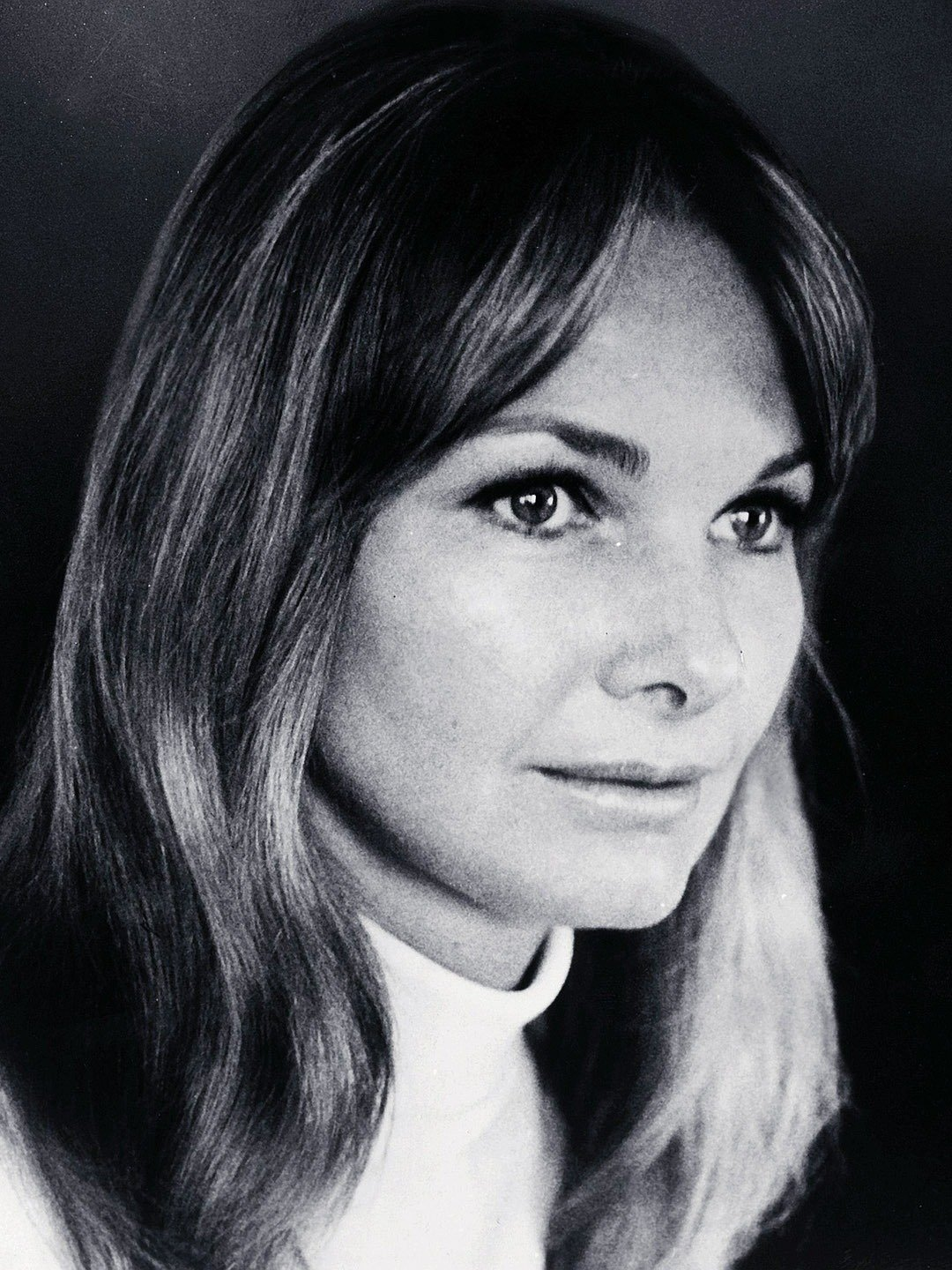
Barbara Loden

- September 3
  - Barbara O'Neil, actress (born 1909)
  - Duncan Renaldo, actor (born 1904)
- September 5 – Barbara Loden, actress and director (born 1932)
- September 6 – Hale Woodruff, artist (born 1900)
- September 12 – Lillian Randolph, actress and singer
- September 30 – John McGuire, actor (born 1929)

=== October ===
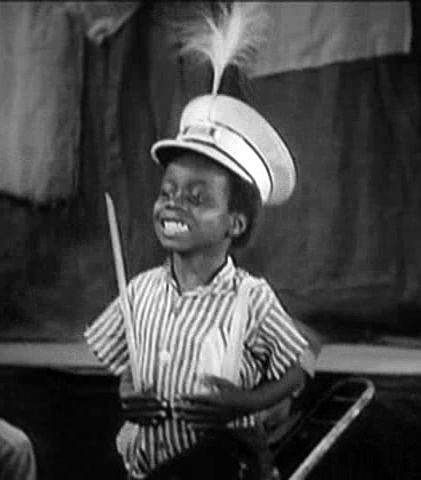
Billie "Buckwheat" Thomas

- October 10 – Billie "Buckwheat" Thomas, actor (born 1931)
- October 14 – Mary O'Hara, author and screenwriter (born 1885)
- October 25 – Virgil Fox, organist (born 1912)
- October 27 – Red Conkright, football player and coach (b. 1914)
- October 28 – Leon Janney, actor (b. 1917)
- October 31 – Elizebeth Smith Friedman, cryptographer (born 1892)

=== November ===
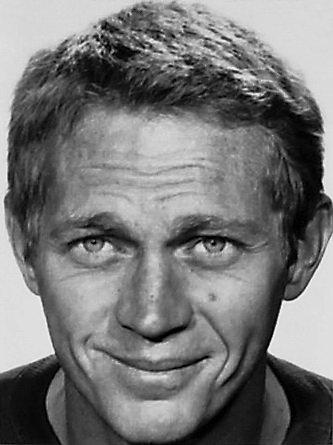
Steve McQueen

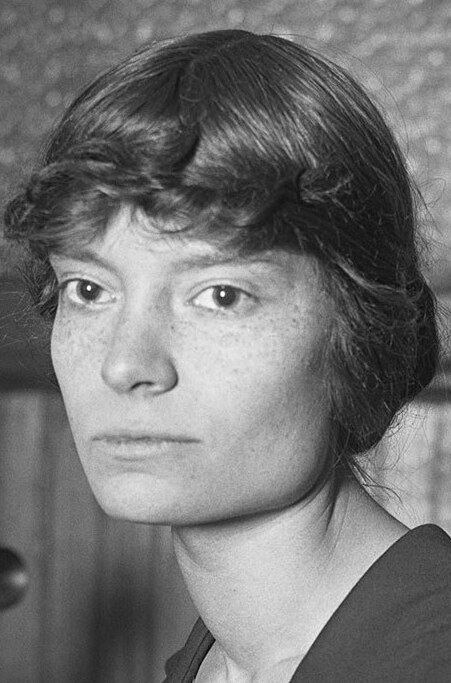
Dorothy Day

- November 1 – Sherri Jarvis, murder victim who was unidentified for 41 years (b. 1966)
- November 7 – Steve McQueen, actor (b. 1930)
- November 9
  - Carmel Myers, actress (born 1899)
  - Victor Sen Yung, actor (born 1915)
- November 15 – Bill Lee, playback singer (born 1916)
- November 22
  - Leonard Barr, stand-up comic, actor, and dancer (b. 1903)
  - Mae West, actress, comedian, and singer (b. 1893)
- November 24 – George Raft, actor and dancer (b. 1901)
- November 29
  - Dorothy Day, journalist and social activist (b. 1897)
  - Babe London, actress and comedian (b. 1901)

=== December ===
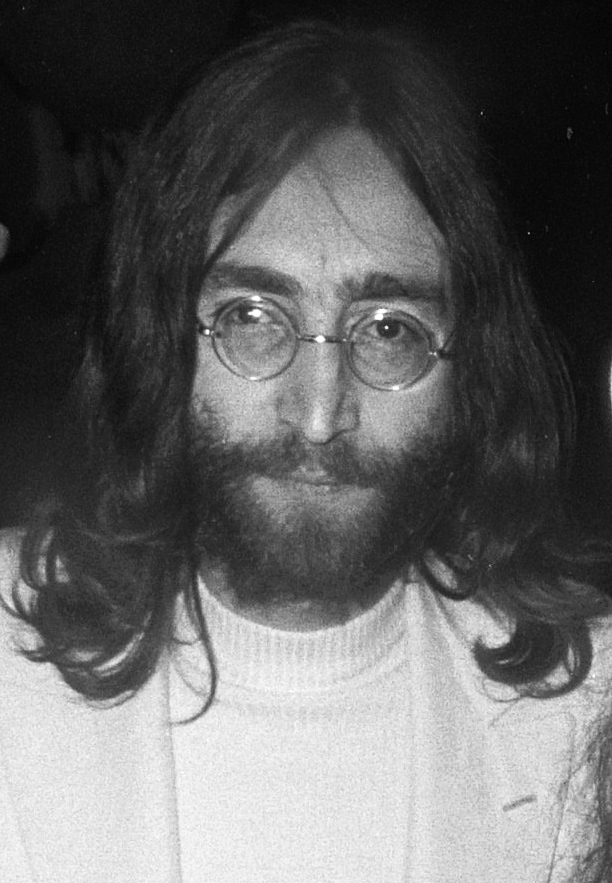
John Lennon

- December 4 – Stanisława Walasiewicz (Stella Walsh), track and field athlete, born in Poland (born 1911)
- December 7 – Darby Crash, musician (born 1958)
- December 8 – John Lennon, British musician, singer, songwriter, and murder victim, died in New York City (born 1940)
- December 11 – Dorothy West, actress (born 1891)
- December 14 – Elston Howard, baseball player (born 1929)
- December 16 – Colonel Sanders, founder of Kentucky Fried Chicken (born 1890)
- December 18 – Frances Fuller, actress born 1907)
- December 24 – Siggie Nordstrom, model, actress, entertainer, socialite and singer (born 1983)
- December 26 – Richard Chase, serial killer (born 1950)
- December 28 – Sam Levene, actor (born 1905)
- December 29 – Tim Hardin, singer-songwriter (born 1941)

== See also ==
- 1980 in American television
- List of American films of 1980
- Timeline of United States history (1970–1989)
