= Peter J. Weber =

American architect (1893–1983)

Peter Joseph Weber
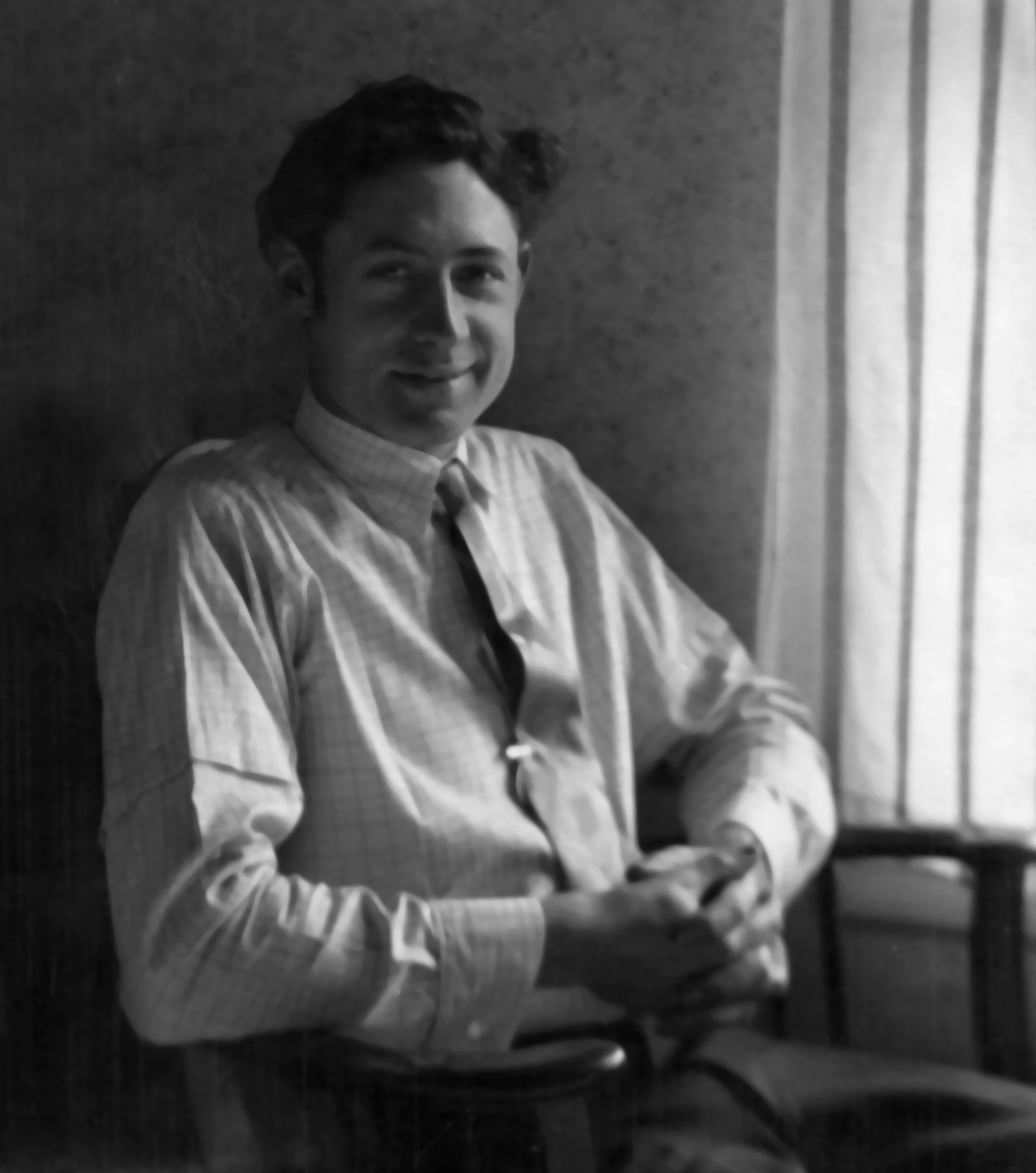
- Weber in his office, Riverside, California, c. 1928
- Born: September 24, 1893; San Francisco, California
- Died: December 4, 1983 (aged 90); Sunland, California
- Burial place: Oak Park Cemetery, Claremont, California
- Education: Certificate of Proficiency in Architecture, University of Pennsylvania 1917
- Occupation: Architect
- Years active: 1906–1958
- Employer(s): G. Stanley Wilson, John Galen Howard, Julia Morgan, Albert Pissis
- Organization: American Institute of Architects
- Notable work: The Mission Inn Hotel & Spa, Corona High School (now Civic Center), Riverside Municipal Auditorium, San Bernardino Valley College Auditorium, Palm Springs High School, Fullerton City Hall, Peter J. Weber House
- Spouse: Clara Teresa Hartnett (1931–1982)
- Children: 1

Peter Joseph Weber (1893–1983) was an American architect who worked in California from 1906 to 1958. Trained in the Beaux-Arts style and technique, he is known primarily for his Mediterranean Revival work in Riverside, California. Nine of his renditions (plus two other projects he contributed to) for the firm of G. Stanley Wilson, Architect are for structures listed on the National Register of Historic Places.

== Early life and education ==
Weber was born in San Francisco, California on September 24, 1893 to Peter Weber and Katie Cronin, first-generation immigrants, from Luxembourg and Ireland, respectively. He was the oldest of four children. He and his family survived the 1906 San Francisco Earthquake and Fire, but lost almost everything they owned. In the following years, from ages 12 to 22, Weber worked as a junior draftsman for a series of notable architects in San Francisco including John Galen Howard, Albert Pissis, William B. Faville, Willis Polk, and Julia Morgan. He studied at the Wilmerding School of Industrial Arts from 1907 to 1911 and as a member of the San Francisco Architectural Club, took part in their atelier program from 1913 to 1915, where he learned the beaux-arts process and style from local architects who had studied at the École des Beaux-Arts. In 1914, Weber received a scholarship when his design placed first in a competition sponsored by the Architectural League of the Pacific Coast to travel to Paris and compete for acceptance to the École des Beaux-Arts. Due to the disruptions and uncertainty caused by the outbreak of World War I in Europe, Weber instead attended the University of Pennsylvania. There, he studied under professor William Powers Laird, was awarded two First Medals in extracurricular competitions sponsored by the Beaux-Arts Institute of Design in New York City, and completed his studies with a Certificate of Proficiency in Architecture in 1917.

== Work with G. Stanley Wilson ==
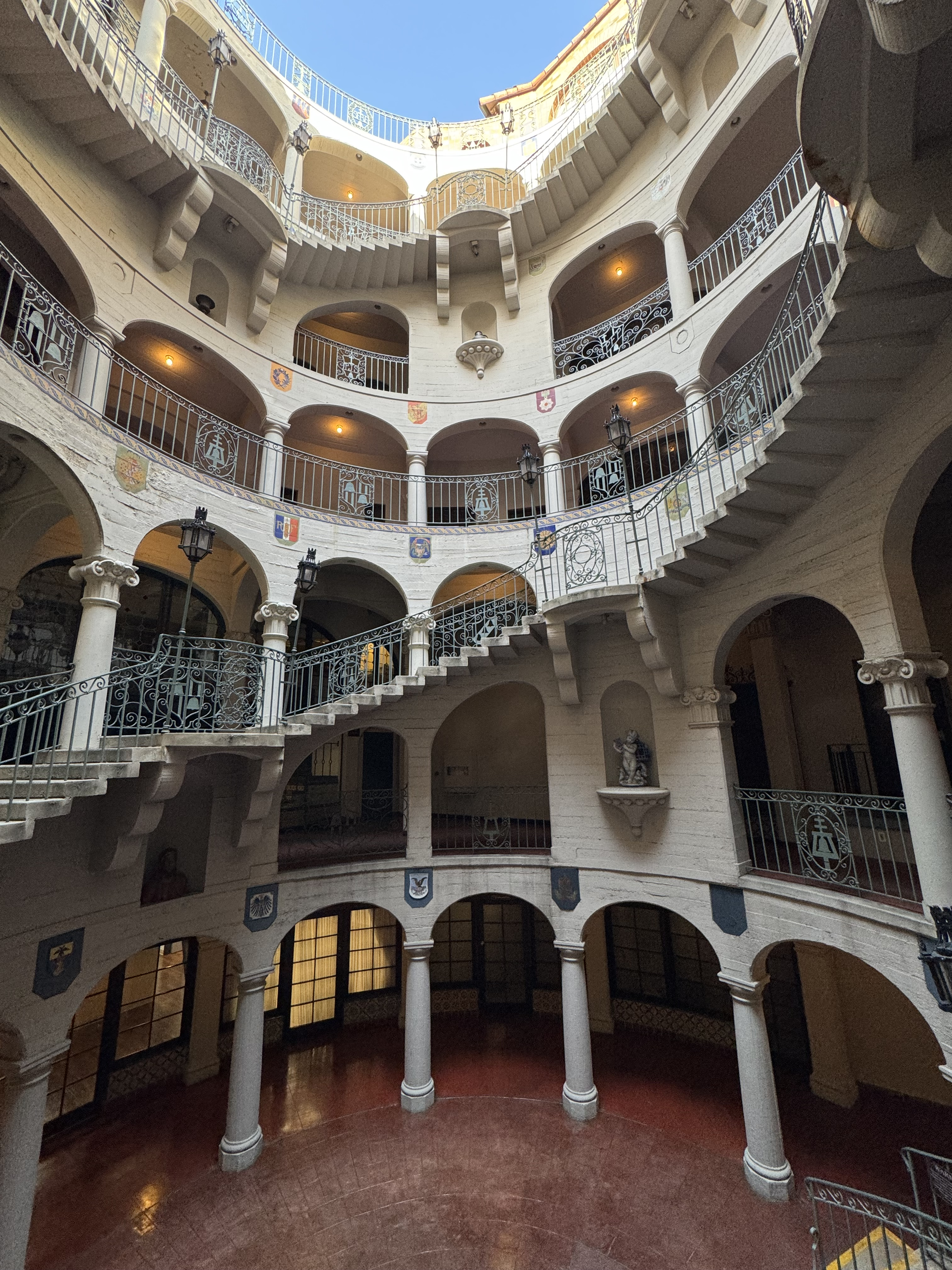
International Rotunda, designed by G. Stanley Wilson, Architect in 1931.Peter J. Weber was a major contributor on this project.

In 1919, Weber settled in Riverside, California, where he became an associate and lead designer for the firm of G. Stanley Wilson. Wilson received his architect's license in 1922, and with the benefit of Weber's talents, his firm quickly became Riverside's most prolific architects of the period. As principal, Wilson attended to client relations, handled contracts, oversaw all projects, and solves structural, functional, and spatial problems to create a viable building design; while Weber managed the office and was lead designer on the majority of Wilson's public and civic projects over the course of their professional relationship, which lasted thirty-seven years. Weber's work in Riverside melded the best of his Beaux-Arts background with various Mediterranean Revival elements. As his career entered its final stages, he included work in the mid-century modern style with designs such as the First Christian Church, Riverside, the Fremont School "Activity Unit" and the St. Francis de Sales Rectory in Riverside, and the First Presbyterian Church, Anaheim. At the behest of Wilson, Weber received his architect's license in 1945.

=== Notable works ===
- Riverside-Arlington Heights Fruit Exchange, 3397 Mission Inn Avenue, Riverside (1923, NRHP-Listed)
- M. H. Simons Undertaking Chapel, 2775 Orange Street, Riverside (1925, NRHP-Listed)
- Lake Norconian Club, junction of Fifth and Western Ave., Norco, California (1929, NRHP-Listed)
- Corona High School (now Civic Center), 815 W. 6th St., Corona, California (1923 and 1931, NRHP-Listed)
- Jefferson Elementary School (Library), 842 W. 10th St., Corona, California (1931, NRHP-Listed)
- United States Post Office (Redlands, California), 201 Brookside Avenue, Redlands (1934, NRHP-Listed)
- Fullerton City Hall, 237 W. Commonwealth Ave., Fullerton, California (1942, NRHP-Listed)
- Mission Inn (Wilson designed 1928 Authors’ Row, 1931 International Rotunda wing, 1944 Carillon Tower), 3649 Mission Inn Ave, Riverside, California (NRHP-Listed)
- Riverside Community Settlement Association (Clubhouse), 4366 Bermuda Avenue, Riverside (1947, NRHP-Listed)
- San Bernardino Valley College (Auditorium), 1938
- Palm Springs High School, Palm Springs, 1939
- Anaheim First Presbyterian Church, Anaheim, 1950

== Honeymoon and return to Riverside ==
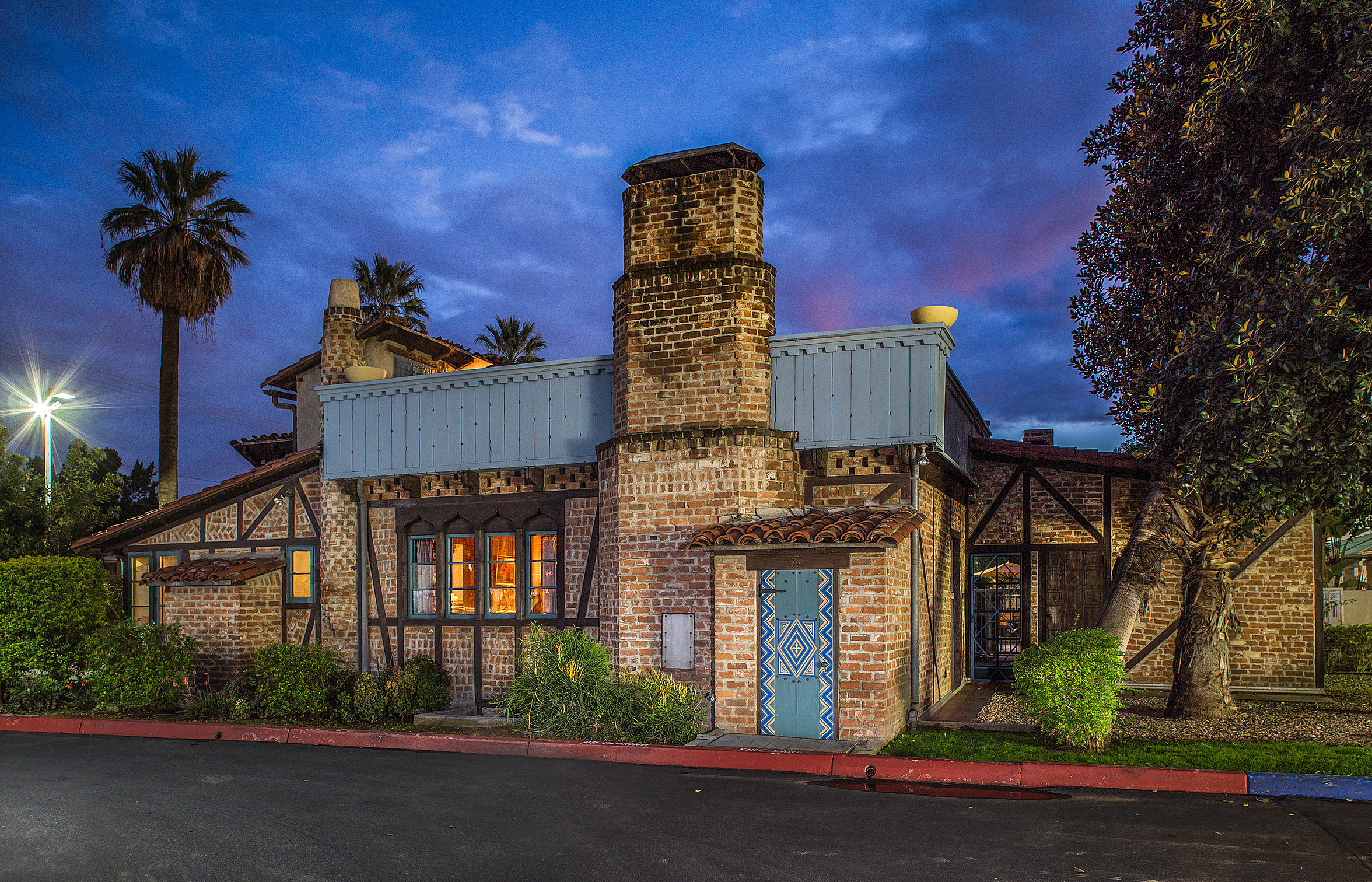
The Peter J. Weber House, Riverside, California

In June 1931, Weber took a leave of absence from the Wilson firm and married Clara Hartnett, a friend of his sister from Richmond, California. Together, they drove cross-country and then traveled to France, beginning a 14-month long honeymoon across Europe and North Africa. Weber took over 8,000 photos as they went, gathering direct inspiration and finally visiting many locations he had originally hoped to see prior to the outbreak of World War I. They returned to Riverside in September 1932. Soon after, Weber began working on the design and construction of his eclectic home, which came to be known as the Peter J. Weber House, a process that took the next six years and remains unfinished. Weber returned to work for G. Stanley Wilson in January 1933 and continued with the firm until the firm’s closure and his retirement in 1956. Peter and Clara had a son, born in November 1937.

== Retirement and death ==
In 1956, G. Stanley Wilson’s firm closed and Weber retired as an architect. He and Clara relocated to the beachside town of Leucadia in 1973, where he extensively remodeled and added on to an existing beach cottage. Clara died in 1982 and Weber in the following year, aged 90. They are buried together at Oak Park Cemetery in Claremont, California. In 2025, his life and work were the basis of a biography, Some Architect: Peter J. Weber’s Enduring Creativity.
