= Riverside Municipal Auditorium =

Event venue in Riverside, California, U.S.

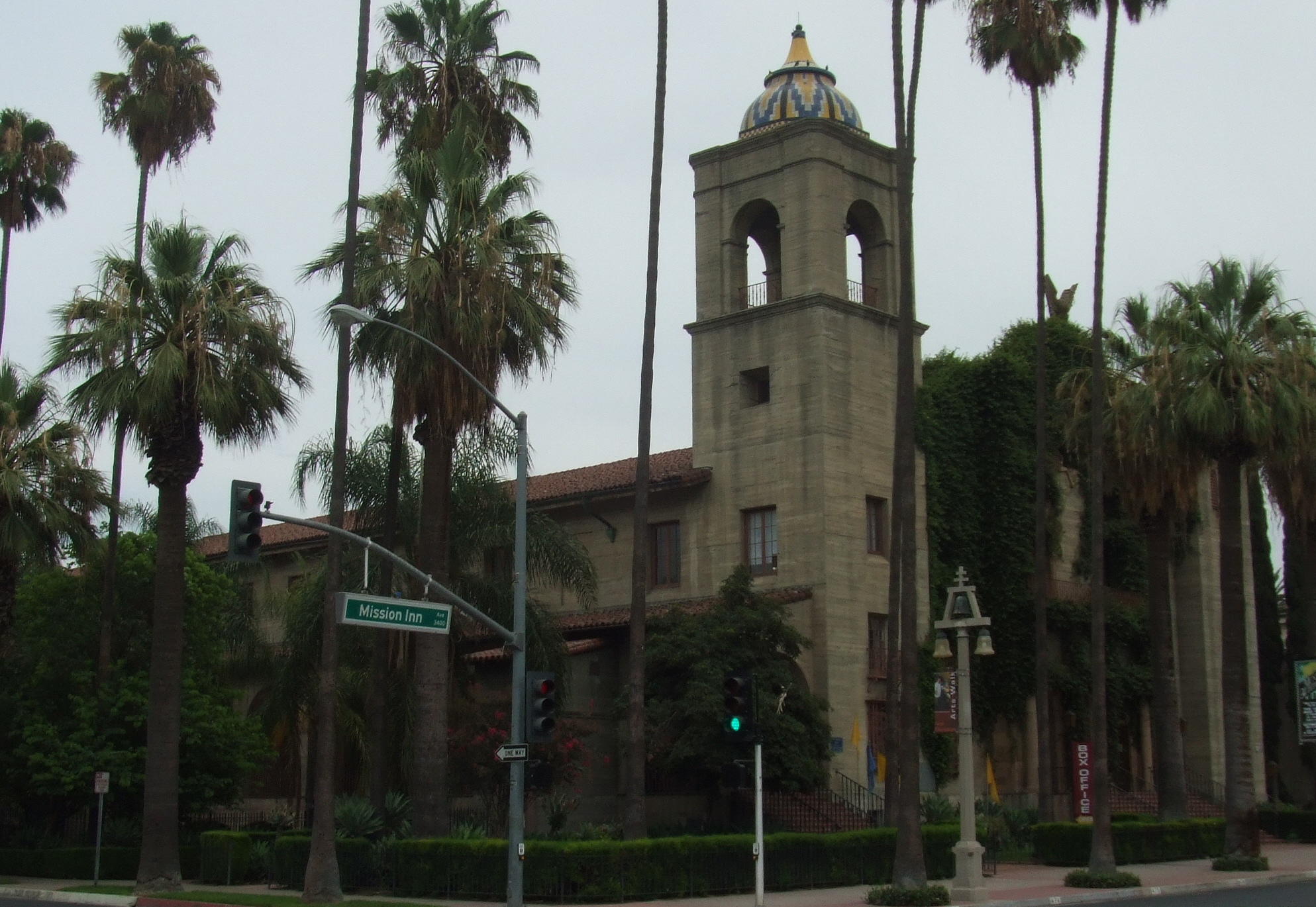
- Interactive map of Riverside Municipal Auditorium
- Address: 3485 Mission Inn Ave; Riverside, California; United States
- Owner: City of Riverside
- Operator: Live Nation
- Capacity: 1,400
- Type: Auditorium

Website
- www.riversiderma.com
- Riverside Municipal Auditorium and Soldiers' Memorial Building
- U.S. National Register of Historic Places
- Riverside Landmark
- Location within California Location within the United States
- Coordinates: 33°58′55″N 117°22′14″W
- Area: 1 acre (0.40 ha)
- Built: 1929
- Architect: Arthur Benton, G. Stanley Wilson
- Architectural style: Mission/Spanish Revival, Moorish, Mexican Colonial
- Restored: 2012
- NRHP reference No.: 78000738
- RIVL No.: 17
- Added to NRHP: March 31, 1978

Riverside Municipal Auditorium and Soldiers' Memorial Building, also known as the Riverside Auditorium and Events Center, is an entertainment venue in Riverside, California, United States. It is owned by the City of Riverside, but is privately managed and available to rent for meetings, conventions and social functions. Opened on November 12, 1928, it also serves as a memorial to the 87 servicemembers from Riverside County who died during World War I. This reinforced concrete Mission Revival style building was added to the National Register of Historic Places in 1978.

The building was designed by architect Arthur Benton and continued by G. Stanley Wilson after Benton's death. Both architects also worked on the historic Mission Inn. Surrounded by gardens, fountains and a waterfall, it was built on land donated by Mission Inn proprietor Frank Miller.

Events at the 1,400 seat auditorium range from charity art shows to orchestral performances by the Riverside Philharmonic. George Lopez, Margaret Cho, The Whispers, Jimmy Cliff, California Riverside Ballet, Frankie Beverly and Maze, David Copperfield, The Dickens Festival, Los Lobos, Children's Theatre, and Industrial shows have all headlined the facility.

Renovations began in October 2011 to upgrade the historic facility. The $9.5 million construction included a complete seismic retrofit, as well as new electrical, plumbing, heating and air conditioning systems. An improved sound system, a new wooden floor in the main theater, and restored historic auditorium seats were also completed in the one-year construction.

== See also ==
- House Of Blues
