= Duane Roberts =

American inventor and hotel owner (1936–2025)

Duane Ronald Roberts (November 4, 1936 – November 1, 2025) was an American businessman, owner of The Mission Inn Hotel & Spa and the inventor of the frozen burrito. He died on November 1, 2025, at the age of 88.
