= Lake Norconian Club =

Historic place in California, US

- U.S. National Register of Historic Places
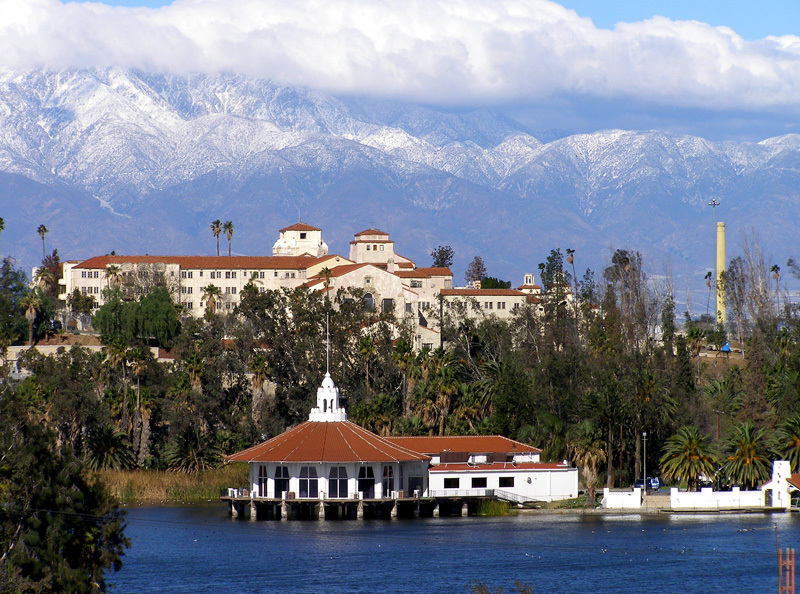
- View of Norconian Resort, Lake and Pavilion, December 2007

- Location within California
- Location: Junction of Fifth and Western Ave., Norco, California
- Coordinates: 33.929°N 117.569°W
- Area: 92 acres (37 ha)
- Built: 1928
- Architect: Clubhouse: Dwight Gibbs; Outbuildings: G. Stanley Wilson; Interiors: A. B. Heinsbergen
- Architectural style: Mission / Spanish Revival
- NRHP reference No.: 00000033
- Added to NRHP: February 4, 2000

The Lake Norconian Club is a historic former hotel/resort in Norco, California, opened in 1929, sited in a rural community, whose main businesses were poultry, rabbits, and agriculture. It was later known as The Norconian (sometimes billed as The Norconian – World's Resort Supreme) and Clark's Hot Springs. The resort complex is still largely intact, after over 70 years as a naval base and prison. It was listed on the National Register of Historic Places in 2000. The listing included seven contributing buildings, five contributing structures, and a contributing site.

== Creation ==
In 1920, after years of land speculation in the San Diego/Julian area of California, Rex Brainerd Clark (May, 1876 – August 31, 1955), through his North Corona Land Company, purchased 15 square miles (39 km^{2}) of land just north of Corona. The land was a failed agricultural community known as "Orchard Heights", but Clark renamed this hilly area "Norco", based on its position North of Corona. In less than three years, Clark's engineer, "Captain" Cuthbert Gulley (April 30, 1878 – 1961) – so named for his service in World War I – laid out streets and installed pumps and reservoirs and on May 13, 1923, "Norco" held its grand opening. In 1925, Gulley, while drilling a well, struck hot mineral water, giving rise to the idea of a health spa that would ultimately become The Norconian.

Construction of the resort began in 1926, and consisted of a golf course, grounds, airfield, hiking trails, Lake Norconian pavilion, chauffeurs' quarters, garage, powerhouse, laundry, and a "clubhouse", which consisted of a first class hotel, two indoor bath complexes, ornate ballroom, dining room and lounge, and the first outdoor Amateur Athletic Union-qualifying swimming and diving pools in Southern California. They remained the only qualifying pools until those that were built in Los Angeles for the 1932 Summer Olympics. The clubhouse architect was Dwight Gibbs, who was also responsible for the Carthay Circle Theatre and the Pasadena Playhouse interior. The outbuildings were designed by G. Stanley Wilson, who also designed Riverside's Mission Inn. All the interiors were designed by A. B. Heinsbergen, who also designed the Pantages Theatre chain. The golf course was designed by John Duncan Dunn.

== Success ==
The Lake Norconian Club opened on February 2, 1929. It was renamed The Norconian on January 20, 1931, so travelers would not be confused and think the resort was a private club.

The resort was initially a great success, with film and sports stars as regular visitors. It was not unusual to see Buster Keaton or Babe Ruth on the golf course. In 1938, actress Lona Andre set a new record for speed in women's golf, shooting 156 holes in 11 hours and 56 minutes. Norma Shearer shot two films at the resort and could be seen riding the trails on horseback on many occasions. Will Rogers, who also shot several films in the vicinity, regularly used the Norconian air field.

In 1933, noted aviator Marshall S. Boggs, who piloted the first "blind" landing entirely using radio signals in 1931, crashed and was killed while making a routine approach to the airfield.

The outdoor diving and swimming pools were in constant use for exhibition matches and AAU-sanctioned competitions, and many Olympic-caliber athletes swam and dove there, including Mickey Riley, Buster Crabbe, Esther Williams, Sammy Lee, Dorothy Poynton, Georgia Coleman, Duke Kahanamoku, Arne Borg and many others. On May 20, 1928, the Norconian pools' grand opening was held – the resort opened in stages – and 18-year-old Cecily Cuhna, heir to the Cuhna fortune, set the world record for the 400-meter swim.

Some of the fastest speedboat races of the day were held on Lake Norconian. Participants included noted female racer Loretta Turnbull ("The Queen of the Seas") and her boat "The Sunkist Kid".

A number of films were shot at the resort – three in 1929 alone, including location shooting for the Joe E. Brown pre-Code musical film, Top Speed. The site became so popular that Fox Studios built complete Norconian sets in their Hollywood sound stages. Norma Talmadge's first "talkie", New York Nights, premiered in nearby Corona, with dozens of Hollywood stars in attendance. Before and after the premiere, many of them stayed at The Norconian.

== The Great Depression ==
The Norconian began to struggle during the Great Depression, and by 1933, the resort was closed. After his divorce from Grace Scripps, Rex Clark was struggling financially. Norco was in the midst of a seven-year drought, and the agricultural success of the 1920s was all but a memory. In 1935 the resort suddenly reopened, likely due to a cash infusion from Rex Clark's former wife's trust fund. The Norconian sputtered along with some landmark occasions. In 1938, Walt Disney Studios, to celebrate the success of Snow White and the Seven Dwarfs, threw a party that has become legendary. The same year MGM tossed their own party at the resort, and in 1940 Fox studios followed suit. During this era, Jeanette MacDonald, Joan Crawford, Basil Rathbone, Stan Laurel and other stars regularly visited the Norconian, as did sports stars Lou Nova (boxer), Helen Wills (tennis), local star Jess Hill (USC coach and star, New York Yankees) and the Pitt football team of 1935.

Nevertheless, for a decade the resort had been in constant jeopardy of closing amidst back taxes owed, mechanic's liens, labor issues and debt owed to creditors. After a name change to "Clark's Hot Springs" in 1940, the resort closed for good.

== Naval hospital ==
In September–October 1941, the United States Navy purchased the resort, and on December 8, 1941, the day after Pearl Harbor, the resort was commissioned the United States Naval Hospital in Corona. The hospital was located in the city of Corona at that time, but when the City of Norco was established in 1964, the hospital was officially located in Norco, as was the post office, which is now called the Norco Post Office. Almost immediately, the Navy held up payment, and Rex Clark spent four long years in court fighting for the $2,000,000 promised by the federal government. He eventually won the suit, but it is unclear exactly what the amount of the judgment was.

The first patients arrived from the Pearl Harbor attack and were housed and treated in the rooms of the former resort. The facility was quickly altered and expanded to include isolation wards – the hospital was the designated national tubercular and malaria treatment center for the United States Navy as well as the Naval Pacific Coast Polio facility – a 200,000 sq ft (19,000 m^{2}) ward addition which was christened by Eleanor Roosevelt, a chapel, complete theater, gymnasium where wheelchair basketball was born on the wheels of "The Rolling Devils", a nurse's quarters, and corpsman quarters, among other facilities. At the hospital's peak in 1945, over 5,000 patients were being treated. Many firsts occurred at the hospital: the first use of penicillin for tubercular patients, the first air transportation of Naval patients across the United States with final destination in Norco, the first uses of polio vaccine outside of Pittsburgh, the first hand-held X-ray machines, as well as advances in prosthetic devices and occupational therapy. Actress Kay Francis was in charge of hospital morale, and she saw to it that many of the stars who frequented the resort now entertained the patients, including The Three Stooges, the Marx Brothers, Abbott and Costello, James Cagney and Clark Gable.

The hospital closed temporarily in 1949 and re-opened in 1950 for the Korean War. During this brief closure the NBS Corona Laboratories (now known as Naval Surface Warfare Center, Corona Division since 2001) was born. The hospital closed for good in 1957, but the Naval Laboratory (then known as Naval Ordnance Laboratory Corona) remained. In 1962, 94 acres (38 ha) in the north were given to the state of California, and on that site was established the California Rehabilitation Center, the first state-funded addiction treatment program in the nation. This voluntary program – those with substance use disorder had a choice of prison or CRC – moved into the old resort clubhouse, the northern wards, north wing, chapel, gymnasium, and nurses quarters. There was a battle of attitudes, correction versus rehabilitation, and correction won. The prison quickly moved from low security to high-medium security and 5,000 inmates resided within its walls.

== Recent history ==
In 1995, the Navy released a study that concluded that no aspect of the Norconian resort era facilities qualified for National Register of Historic Places listing. The City of Norco responded by commissioning an independent study of the property's historical significance. This study found that 19 structures, buildings, and features from the Norconian's resort era were eligible for National Register listing. Subsequently, in 2000, these structures, buildings, and features were placed on the National Register as the Norconian Resort Historic District. The city-funded report did not include the property's World War II and post-World War II histories, but recommended they be separately studied. In 2014, the Navy submitted its historic resources survey and evaluation of these two eras to California State Historic Preservation Officer (SHPO) Carol Rowland Nawi, and the SHPO issued her concurrence with the Navy's report and findings. As it did in the late 1990s, the City of Norco has commissioned an independent survey and evaluation of the property's Naval Hospital and Naval RDT&E eras.

In 2004, a State of California study concluded that the main hotel building was not in compliance with current earthquake construction standards, and it was subsequently abandoned. Today, this 250,000 square foot Spanish Colonial Revival building sits behind twenty-foot-high chain link and concertina wire fences, crumbling from neglect. Inside, chandeliers, hand painted ceilings, Catalina tiled floors and walls, and other features are often exposed through holes in the roof. In 2014, the Lake Norconian Club Foundation filed a lawsuit to force the State of California to obey California law, which requires state agencies to maintain and protect historic buildings on their properties.
