= Peter J. Weber House =

Landmark eclectic house built 1932–1938

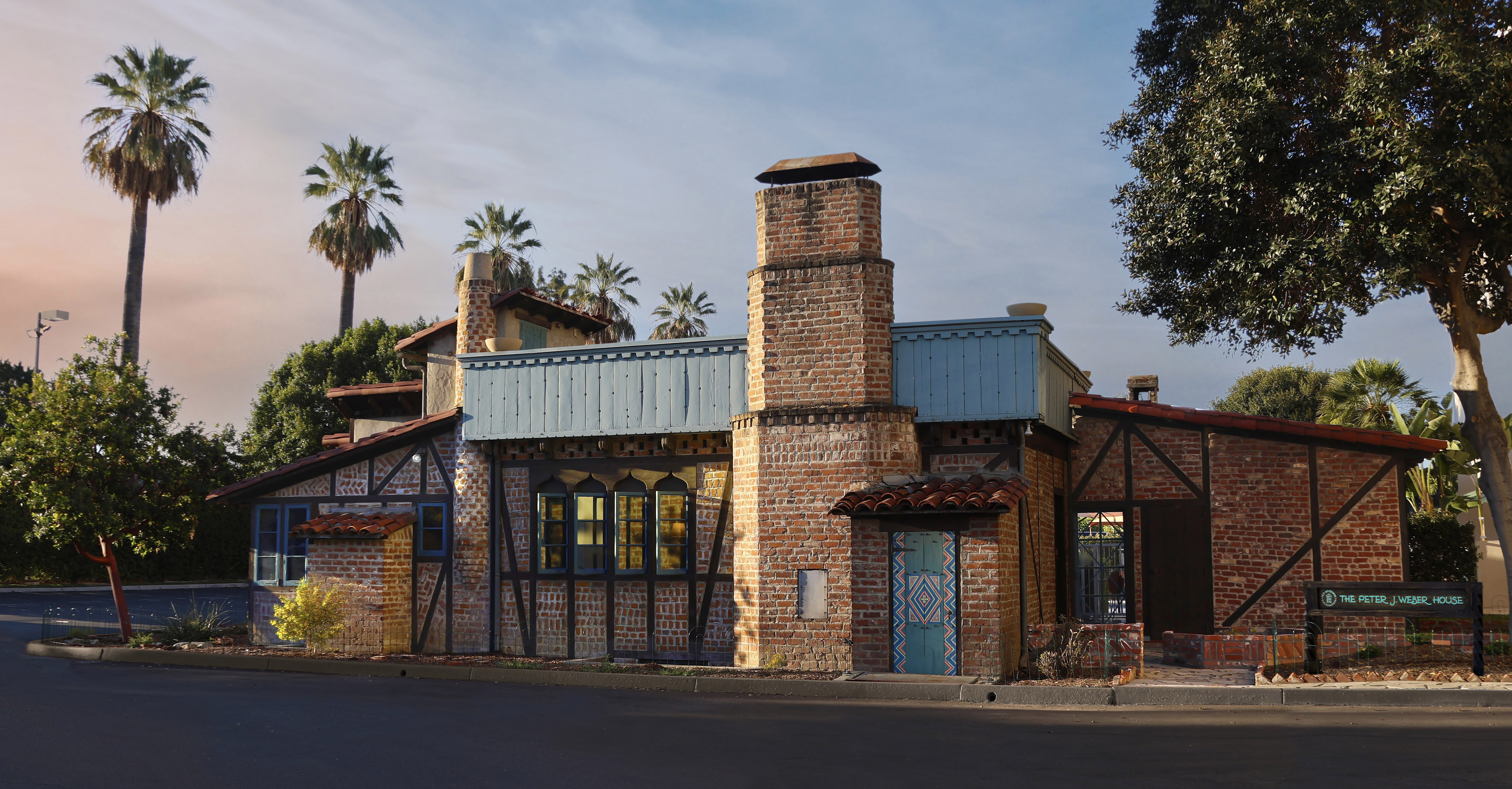
- Interactive map of Peter J. Weber House
- 33.9752°N 117.3446°W
- Location: 1510 University Ave; Riverside, California

History
- Built: 1933–1938

Site notes
- Architect: Peter J. Weber
- Architectural style: Eclectic
- Governing body: Old Riverside Foundation
- Website: Official website

Riverside Landmark
- Designated: 1981
- Reference no.: 52

The Peter J. Weber House (also known simply as "The Weber House") is a historic house and landmark in Riverside, California. The house was designed and built by architect Peter J. Weber in the 1930s as a family residence and an expression of his creative work. The house is notable for its eclectic Depression-era design inspired by Medieval Spanish brick and half-timbering structures (with additional elements of Moorish and broadly Mediterranean influences) and its reliance on salvaged materials.

== Elements of design and construction ==
Built between 1933 and 1938, the house features an abundance of recycled and reclaimed materials and finishes, ornate hand-carved details, and colorful decorated ceilings. Some ahead-of-their-time systems include a 1935 roof-mounted solar water heater enclosed by repurposed Model T windshields and seismic fittings in the basement to protect against earthquake damage, informed by Weber's early work as a teenager with architects including John Galen Howard and Julia Morgan following the 1906 San Francisco earthquake and fire. While Weber was trained and highly skilled in the Beaux Arts style of architecture, for his personal home much of the design was inspired by what he had seen on his year-long honeymoon travels in Europe and North Africa from 1931 to 1932, in particular Mediterranean Moorish and Spanish architecture. The house was initially designed to be expanded into a three-bedroom home with a lookout tower and adjacent den, but Weber never finished the intended expansion due to increased development in the area and other practical restrictions. Rooms include a three-bay garage with basement, wash house, kitchen, breakfast room, and living room with one bedroom and one bathroom. The house was surrounded by ten acres of citrus, stone fruit, and nut trees and bordered a branch of the Gage Canal at its south end. When mother-in-law Amelia Hartnett came to live with them in 1941 after the death of her husband, the Webers relocated their sleeping quarters to the rooftop deck with a corrugated metal shade for protection and slept there year-round. It remained the family home for Weber, his wife Clara, son Peter N., and Amelia Hartnett for almost 40 years.

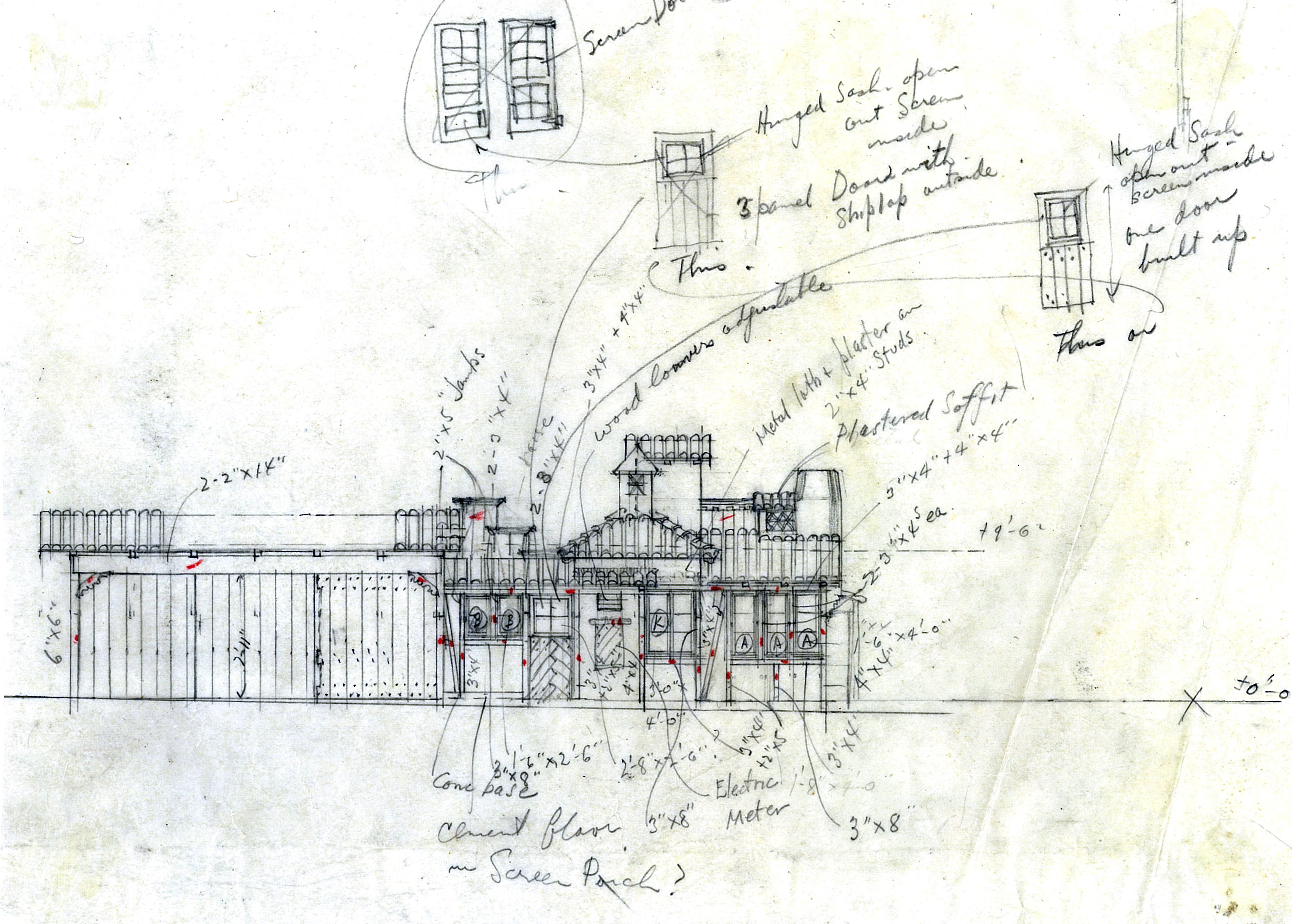
Weber's annotated concept drawings of the Weber House, 1932

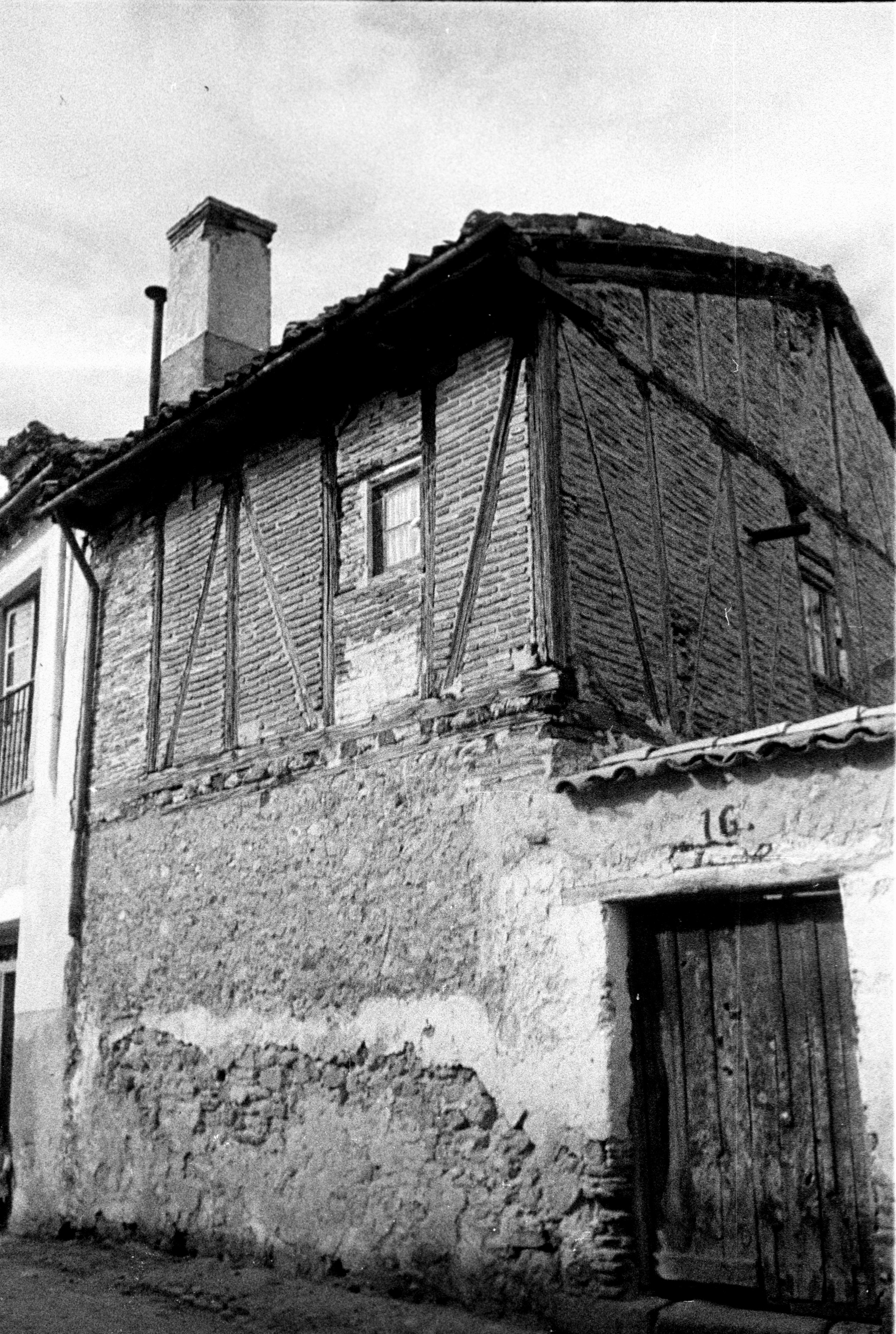
Medieval half-timbered house photographed by Weber, spring 1932, Segovia, Spain

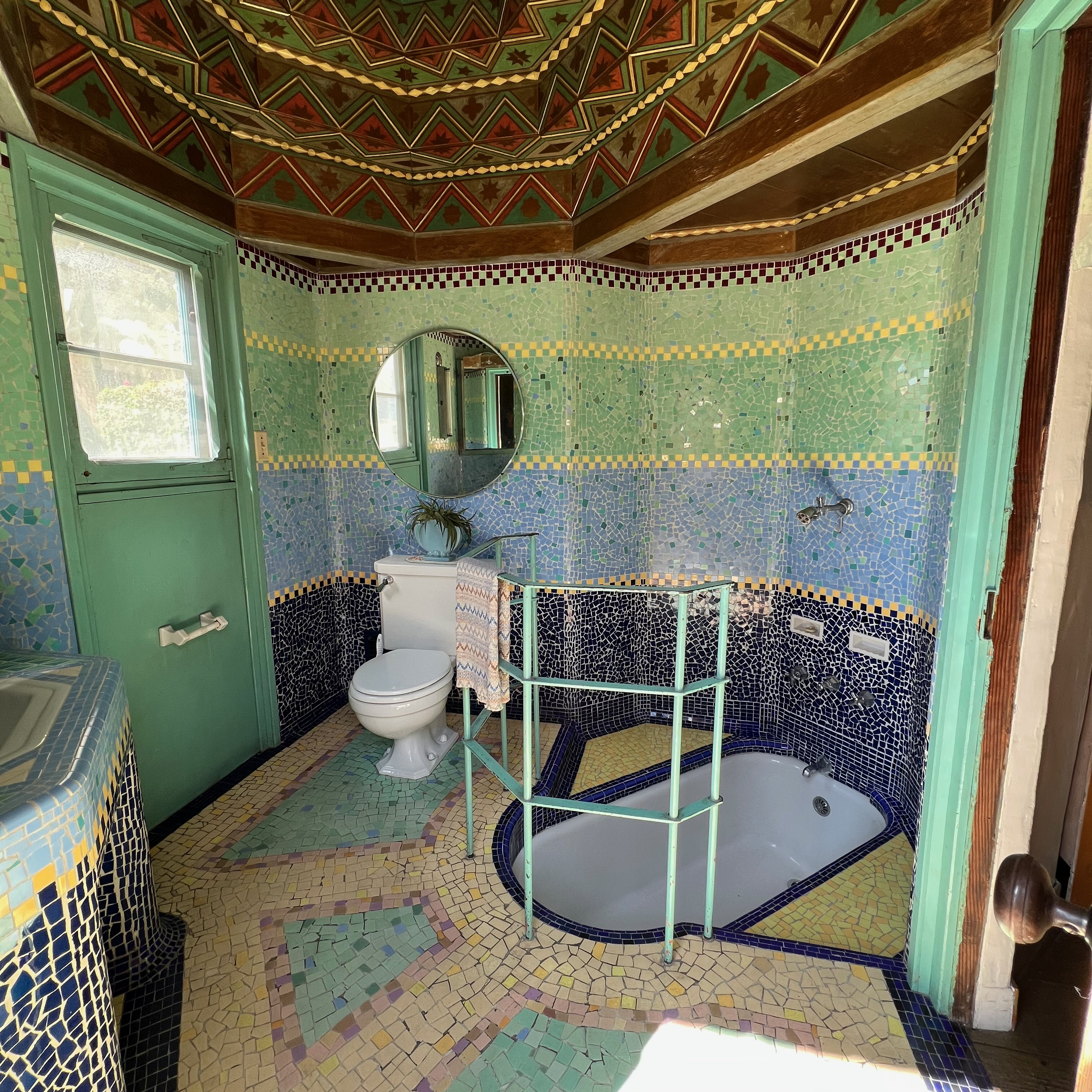
Mosaic tiled bathroom with sunken tub

== Rescue from demolition ==
In 1973, the Webers moved to Leucadia and their home was rented to a series of tenants while they searched for buyers of their property, divided into four parcels. In 1980, Bob Kneisel began renting the house and initiated the work of its restoration and archiving its history. Through his efforts along with Riverside's Cultural Heritage Board, local advocacy group Old Riverside Foundation, and Alan Curl of the Riverside Metropolitan Museum, the house was recognized as Riverside City Landmark #52 in 1981. After the death of Peter J. Weber in 1983, the parcel containing the house was sold to Days Inn for redevelopment, who initially sought removal of its landmark status and demolition or relocation of the house, but the Cultural Heritage Board determined the house must remain intact at its original location, so the hotel built their parking lot and swimming pool around it. It has since been restored to much of its original condition and is available for private tours.

== See also ==
- List of landmarks in Riverside, California
