= Arlington Branch Library and Fire Hall =

- U.S. National Register of Historic Places
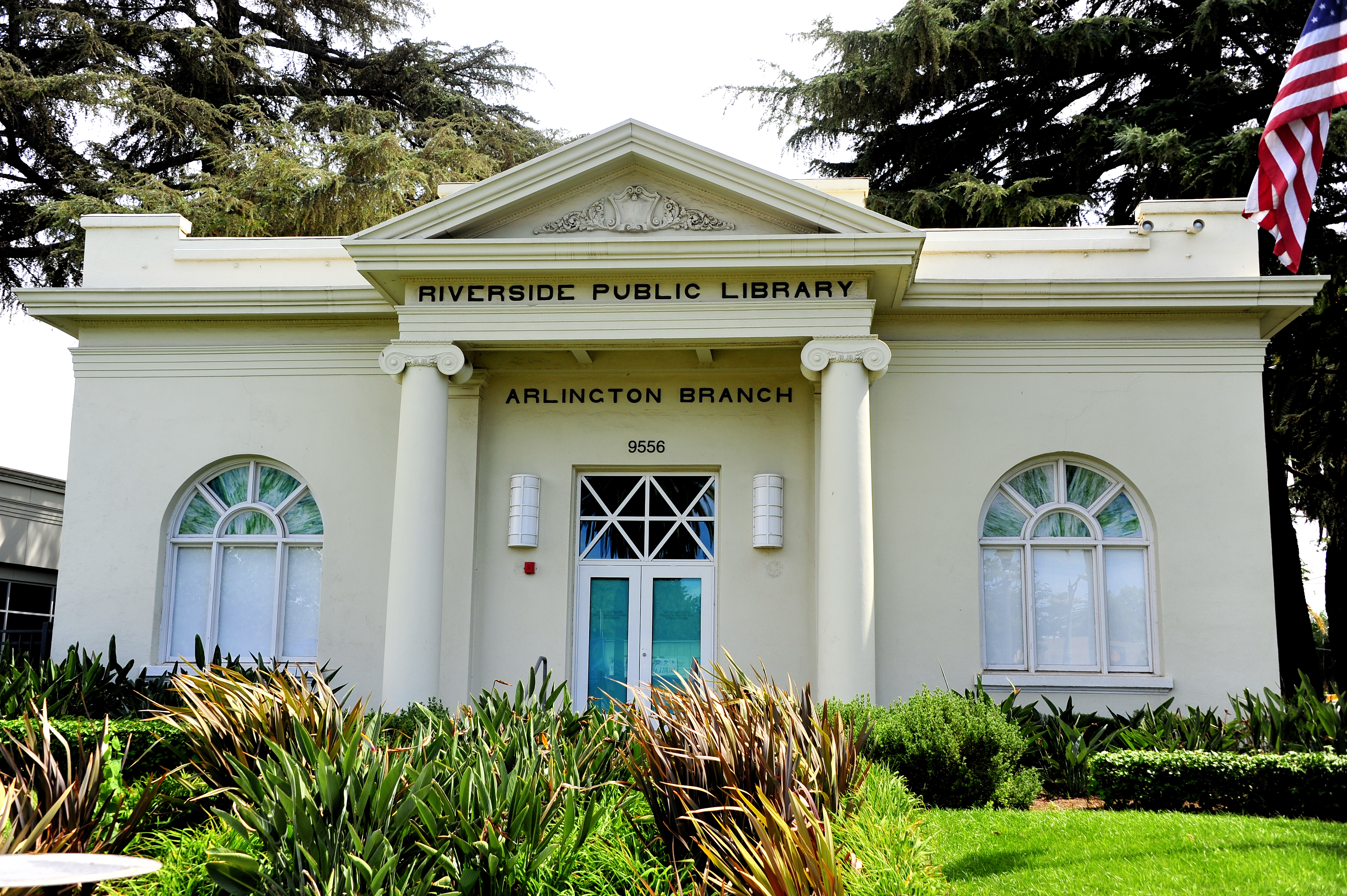

- Location within California Location within the United States
- Location: 9556 Magnolia Ave., Riverside, California
- Coordinates: 33°55′11″N 117°26′48″W
- Area: less than one acre
- Architect: Pillar, Seeley; Wilson, G.S.
- Architectural style: Classical Revival
- NRHP reference No.: 93000668
- Added to NRHP: July 22, 1993

The Arlington Branch Library and Fire Hall, in Riverside, California, is a historic library and a fire station which was listed on the National Register of Historic Places in 1993.

The Classical Revival library was built in 1908 and renovated in 1927–28. It was originally designed by architect Seeley L. Pillar (1865-1968), and architect G. Stanley Wilson (1879-1958) designed the renovations.
