= United States Post Office (Redlands, California) =

- US Post Office--Redlands Main
- U.S. National Register of Historic Places
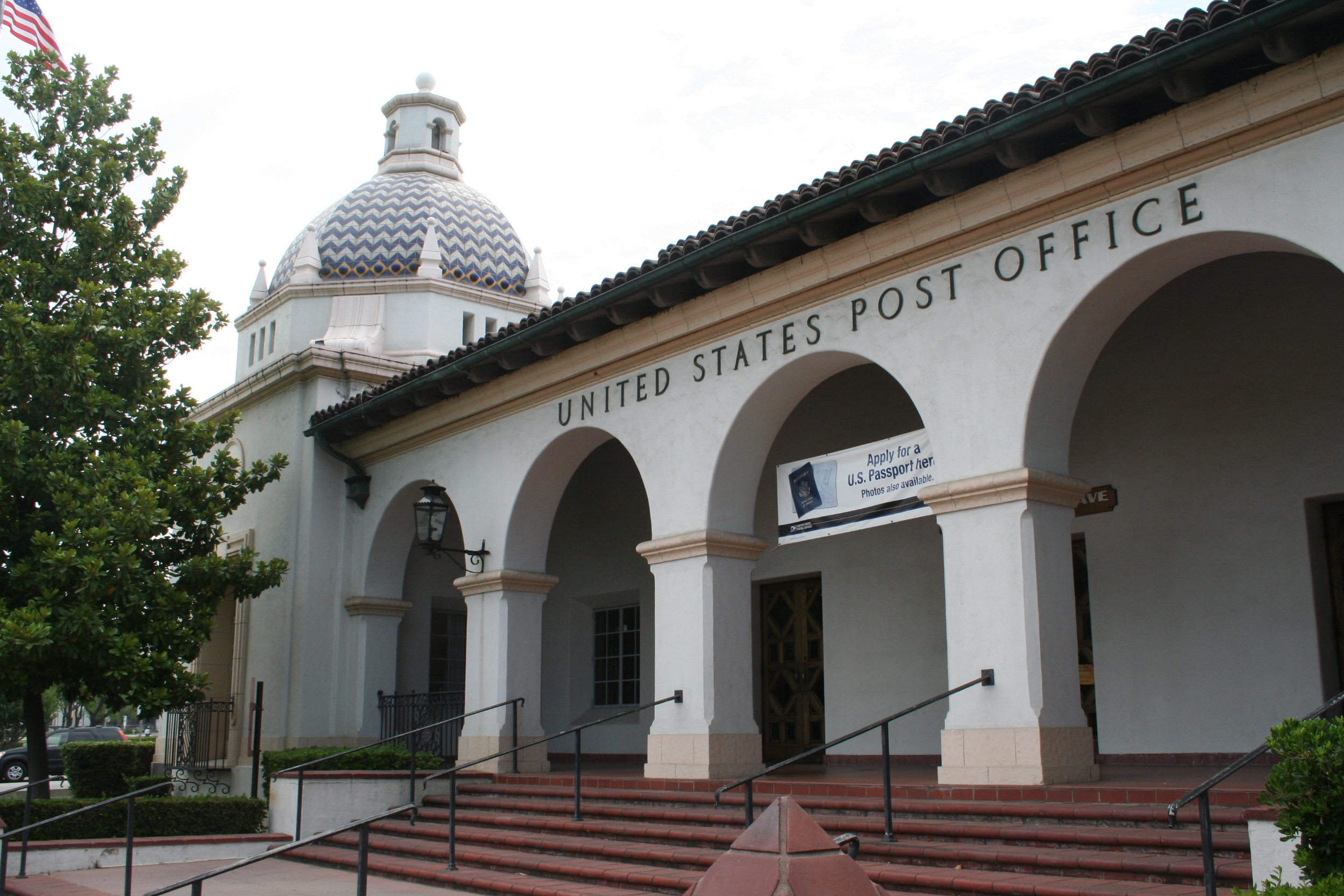

- Location within California Location within the United States
- Location: 201 Brookside Ave., Redlands, California
- Coordinates: 34°3′18″N 117°11′5″W
- Area: 1 acre (0.40 ha)
- Built: 1935
- Architect: Wilson, G. Stanley
- Architectural style: Mission Revival
- MPS: US Post Office in California 1900-1941 TR
- NRHP reference No.: 85000135
- Added to NRHP: January 11, 1985

The U.S. Post Office, located at 201 Brookside Avenue, is the main post office in Redlands, California. Locally prominent architect G. Stanley Wilson designed the post office, which was built from 1932 to 1935. While Wilson's design was primarily in the Mission Revival style, he also incorporated elements of the related Spanish Colonial Revival and Mediterranean Revival styles. The post office features an asymmetrical plan, setting it apart from most federal buildings of the 1930s. The front entrance is marked by an arcade supported by piers. An octagonal Moorish dome marks one of the front corners; both the main building and the dome have tile roofs. Wilson used wrought iron to decorate the interior arches and service windows, an element which has not been observed in any other historic California post office.

The post office was added to the National Register of Historic Places on January 11, 1985.

== See also ==
- National Register of Historic Places listings in San Bernardino County, California
- List of United States post offices
