= Fullerton City Hall =

- U.S. National Register of Historic Places
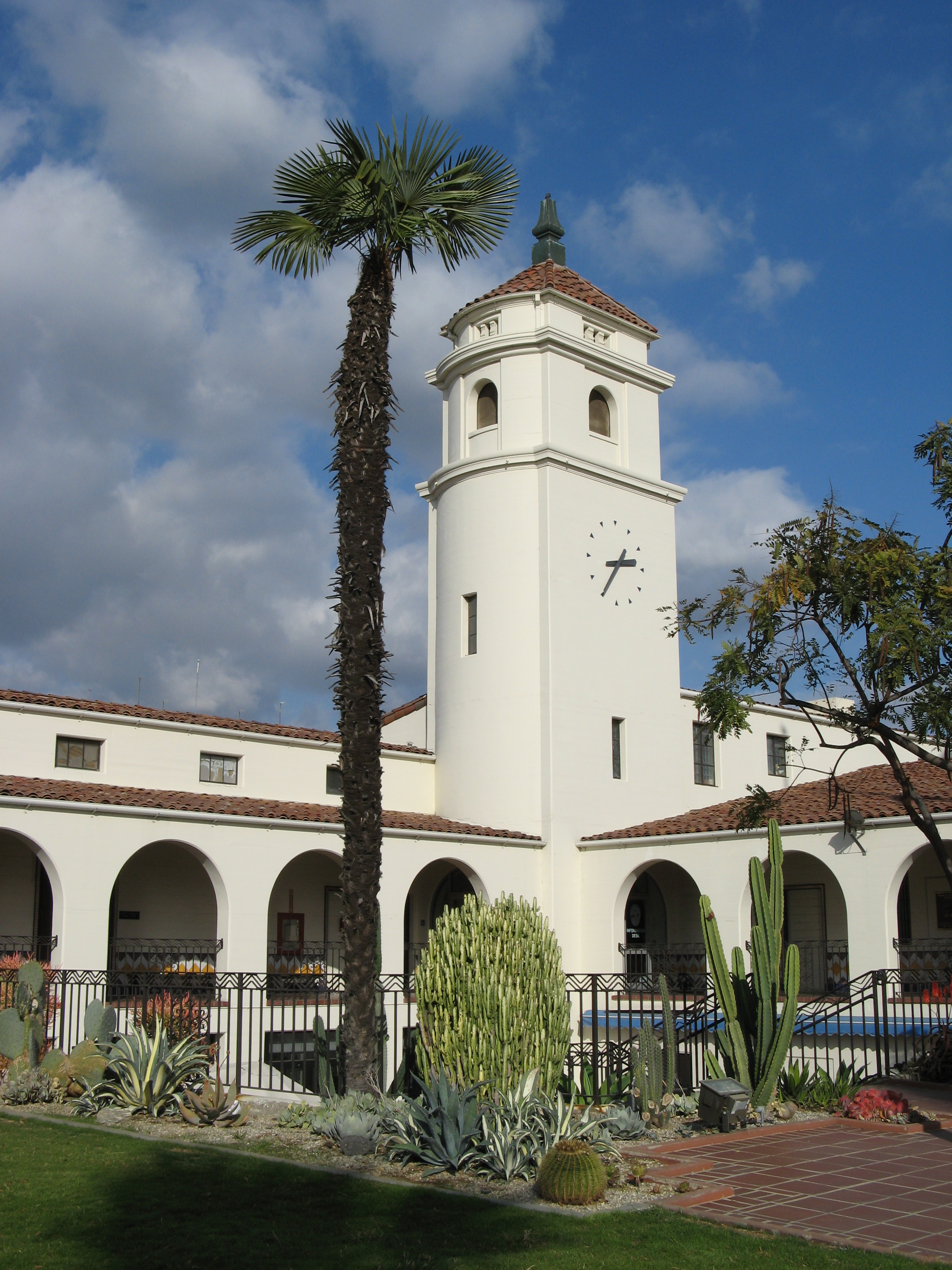

- Location within California
- Location: 237 W. Commonwealth Ave., Fullerton, California
- Coordinates: 33°52′21″N 117°55′46″W
- Area: 2.7 acres (1.1 ha)
- Built: 1939-1942
- Architect: G. Stanley Wilson
- Architectural style: Mission/spanish Revival
- NRHP reference No.: 03000424
- Added to NRHP: May 22, 2003

The historic Fullerton Police Station, formerly Fullerton City Hall, at 237 W. Commonwealth Ave. in Fullerton, California, was built during 1939 to 1942. It was designed in Mission Revival style by influential architect G. Stanley Wilson, and was made of poured concrete. Ceramic tiles and terra cotta for the project were produced by Gladding, McBean and Company.

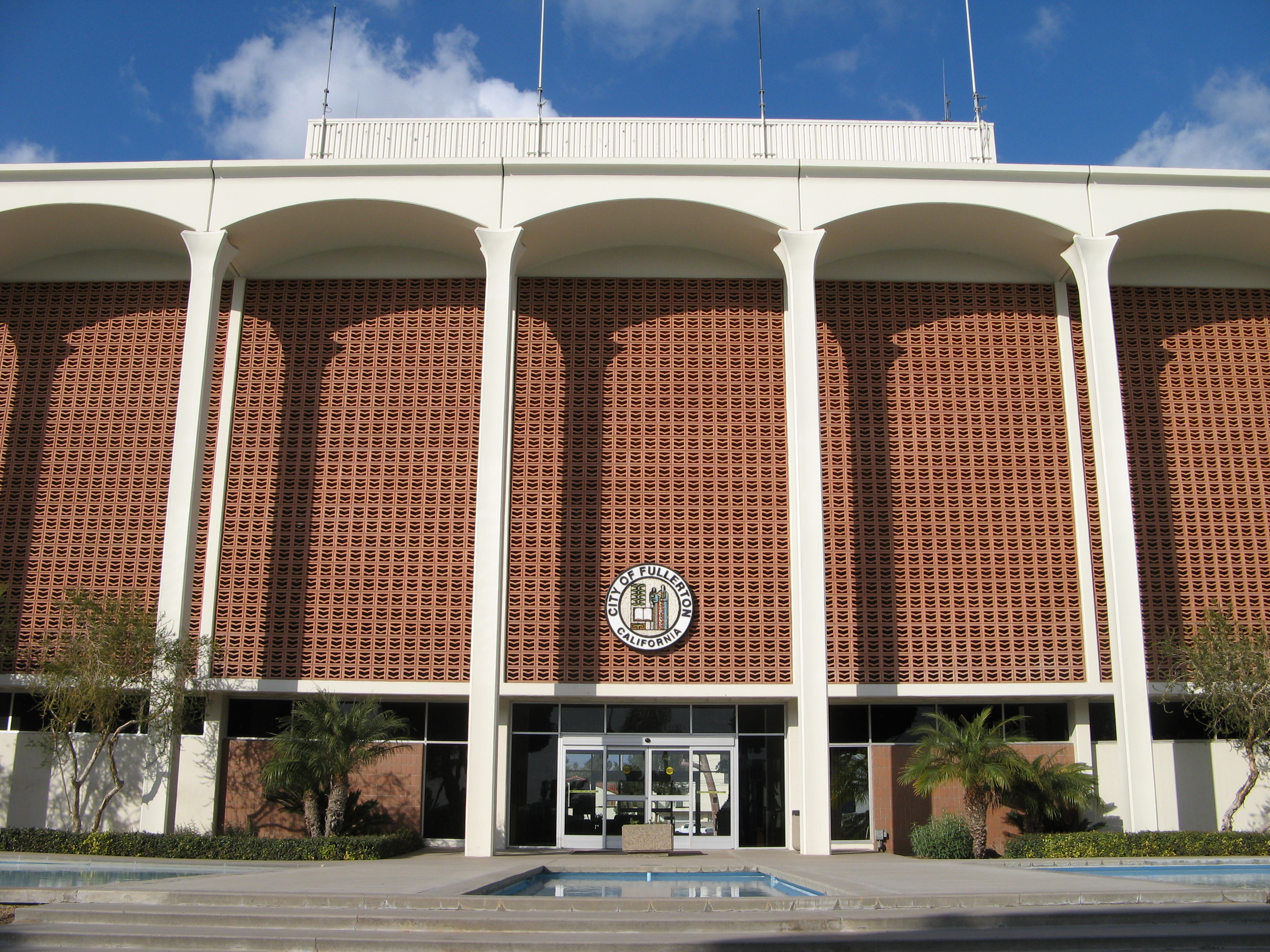
Current city hall (not the NRHP-listed building), at 303 W. Commonwealth Avenue

The current city hall, at 303 W. Commonwealth Avenue, is in the New Formalism style of architect. The front arches are inspired by the original city hall and the terra cotta color salutes the roofing material used in the first city hall.

The historic building has included the Fullerton Police Department, the Fullerton Jail and the Wayne H. Bornhoft Facility. It has served as a city hall, a courthouse, and a meeting hall.
