= G. Stanley Wilson =

American architect active in Riverside, California

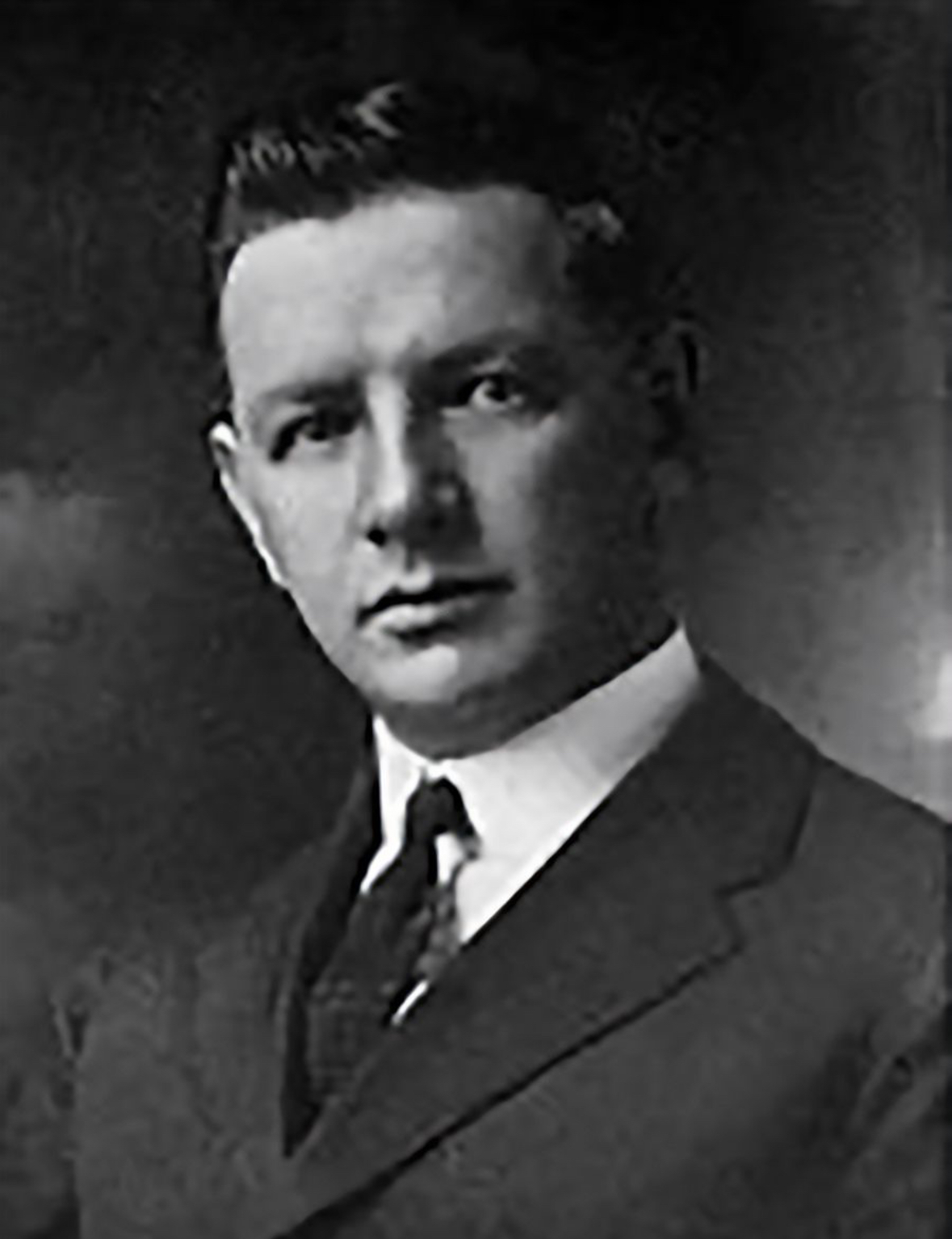
A studio portrait of California architect G. Stanley Wilson, circa 1922.

George Stanley Wilson (1879–1958) was an American architect and builder based in Riverside, California.

Wilson was born in Bournemouth, England in 1879. He came to Riverside, California in 1895 with his family at age 16.

He started his career as a carpenter around 1900 and progressed to become an independent builder by 1903. In 1909, he opened the office of G. Stanley Wilson, Architect. In 1919, he hired Peter J. Weber as his architectural illustrator, a collaboration that lasted thirty-seven years and produced an estimated 1,000 projects across Southern California.

In 1923, Wilson received his license as an architect from the California State Board of Architecture after initial certification by the International Correspondence School. He was an active civic booster in the city of Riverside, belonged to many fraternal organizations, was a regional Vice President of the American Institute of Architects, and served on the California State Board of Architectural Examiners.

Eleven of his projects are listed on the U.S. National Register of Historic Places for their architecture:

- Riverside-Arlington Heights Fruit Exchange, 3397 Mission Inn Avenue, Riverside (1923)
- M. H. Simons Undertaking Chapel, 2775 Orange Street, Riverside (1925)
- Arlington Branch Library and Fire Hall (renovation of architect Seeley Pillar's 1909 original), 9556 Magnolia Avenue, Riverside (1928)
- Soldier's Memorial & Municipal Auditorium Building, 3485 Mission Inn Avenue, Riverside, (completed after the death of principal architect Arthur B. Benton, 1928)
- Lake Norconian Club, junction of Fifth and Western Ave., Norco, California (1929)
- Corona High School (now Civic Center), 815 W. 6th St., Corona, California (1923 and 1931)
- Jefferson Elementary School (Library), 842 W. 10th St., Corona, California (1931)
- United States Post Office (Redlands, California), 201 Brookside Avenue, Redlands (1934)
- Fullerton City Hall, 237 W. Commonwealth Ave., Fullerton, California (1942)
- Mission Inn (Wilson designed Authors’ Row in 1928 , 1931 International Rotunda wing, 1944 Carillon Tower), 3649 Mission Inn Ave, Riverside, California
- Riverside Community Settlement Association (Clubhouse), 4366 Bermuda Avenue, Riverside (1947)

His firm closed in 1956 and he died in 1958. He was buried in Evergreen Cemetery, Riverside's first cemetery.

== See also ==
- Peter J. Weber
