= The Mission Inn Hotel & Spa =

Historic hotel in Riverside, California

- Mission Inn
- U.S. National Register of Historic Places
- U.S. National Historic Landmark
- California Historical Landmark No. 761
- Riverside Landmark
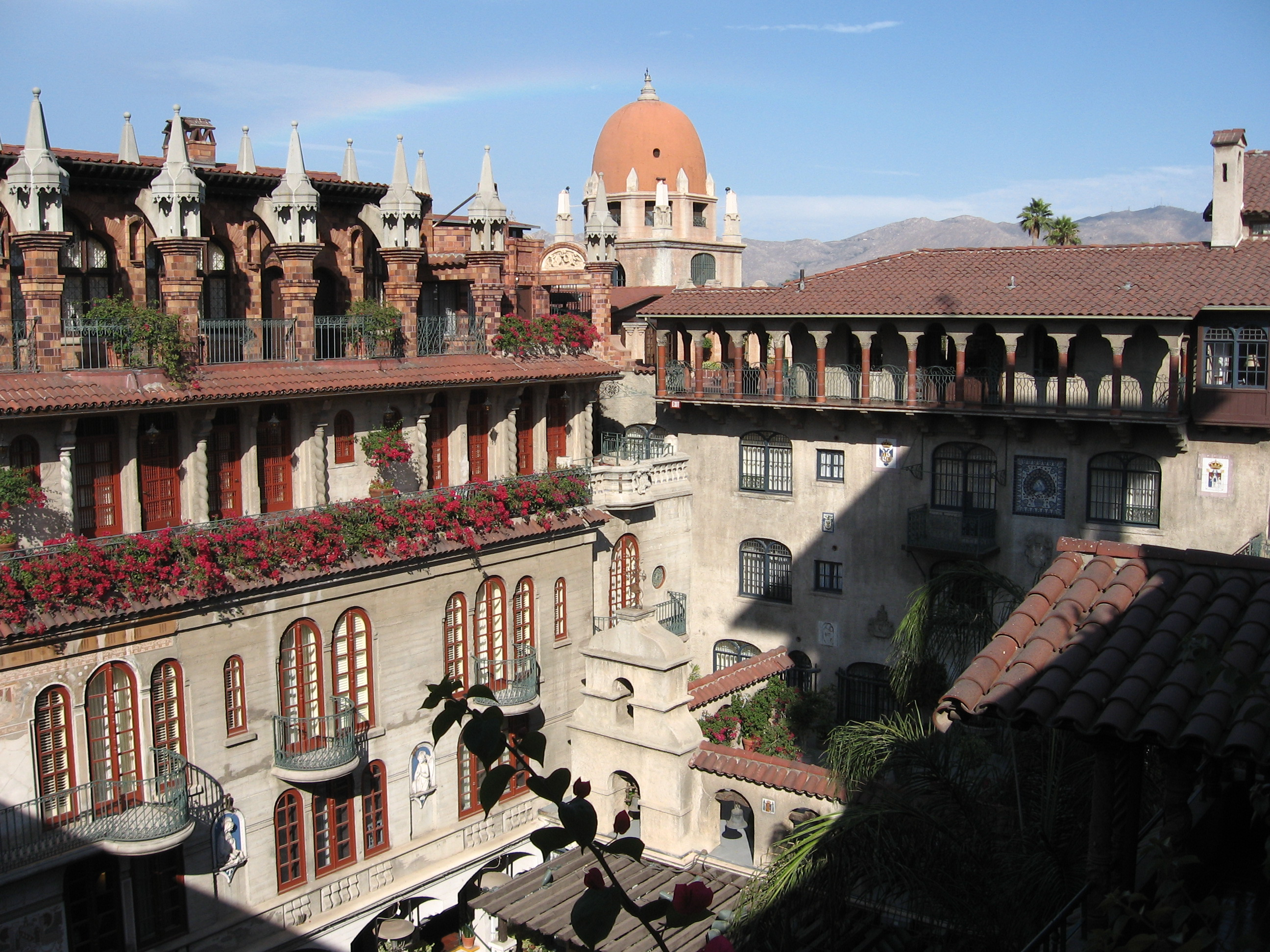
- Mission Inn, Riverside, California

- Location within the Los Angeles metropolitan area Location within California Location within the United States
- Location: 3649 Mission Inn Ave, Riverside, California
- Coordinates: 33°59′00″N 117°22′22″W
- Built: 1903–1931
- Architect: Multiple
- Architectural style: Mission/Spanish Revival
- Restored: 1985–1992
- Restored by: Carley Capital Group, Henzin Holding Co., & Riverside Redevelopment Agency
- NRHP reference No.: 71000173
- CHISL No.: 761
- RIVL No.: 1

Significant dates
- Added to NRHP: May 14, 1971
- Designated NHL: May 5, 1977

The Mission Inn, now known as The Mission Inn Hotel & Spa, is a historic landmark hotel in downtown Riverside, California. Although a composite of many architectural styles, it is generally considered the largest Mission Revival Style building in the United States. Frank Augustus Miller borrowed architectural elements from California missions and European castles as he developed the property from 1880 till his death in 1935. He also acquired antiques and art from his travels around the world.

Mission Inn Hotel & Spa is a member of Historic Hotels of America, the official program of the National Trust for Historic Preservation.

== History ==
The property began as an adobe boarding house called Glenwood Cottage, built by engineer/surveyor Christopher Columbus Miller and on November 22, 1876, the Millers took their first paying guest. In February 1880, Miller's son Frank Augustus Miller purchased the hotel and land from his father. It became a full-service hotel in the early 1900s due to California's economic citrus boom and warm weather, attracting wealthy travelers and investors from the East Coast and Europe. In 1902, Frank changed the name to the "Glenwood Mission Inn" and started building, in a variety of styles, until he died in 1935.

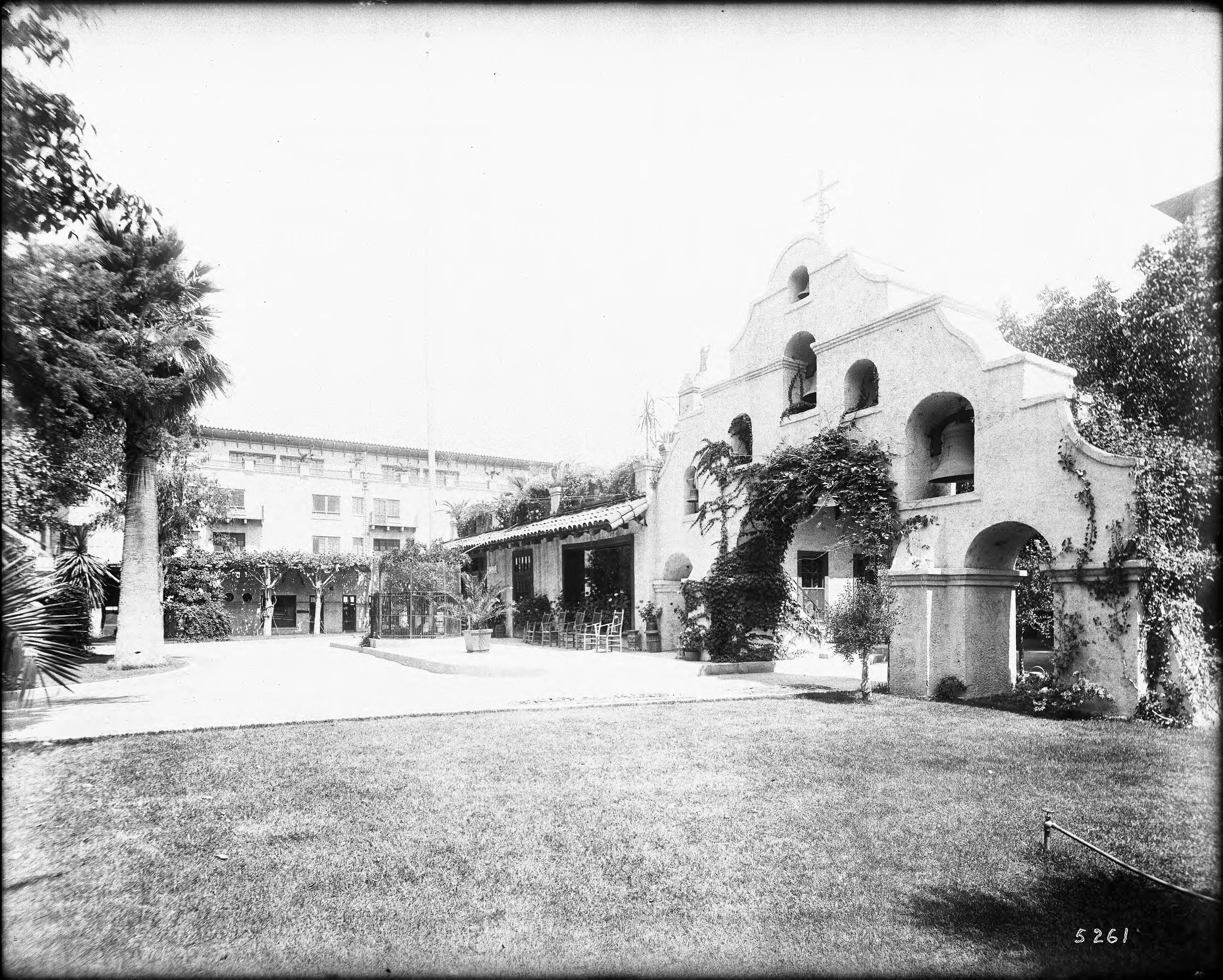
Courtyard, c. 1910

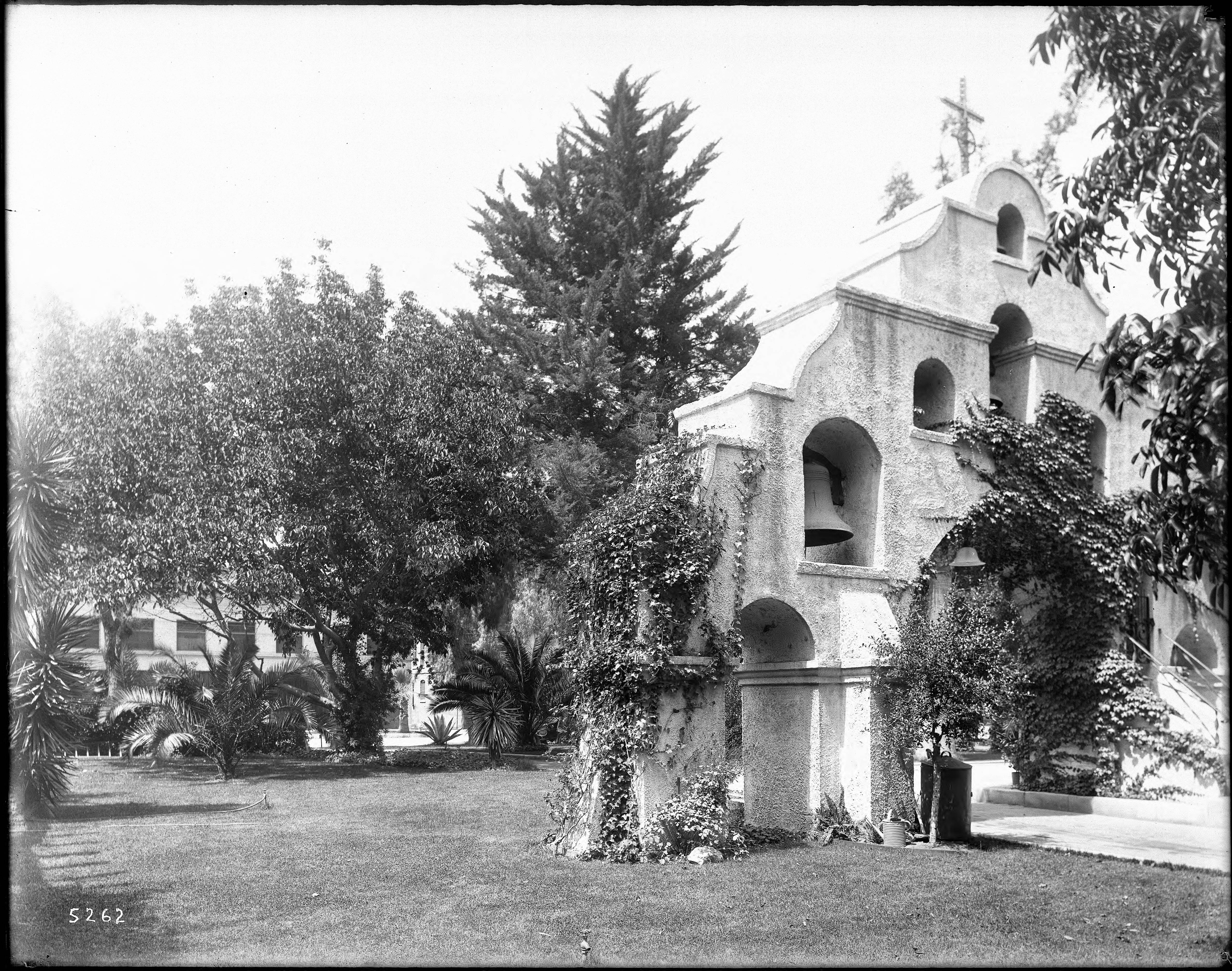

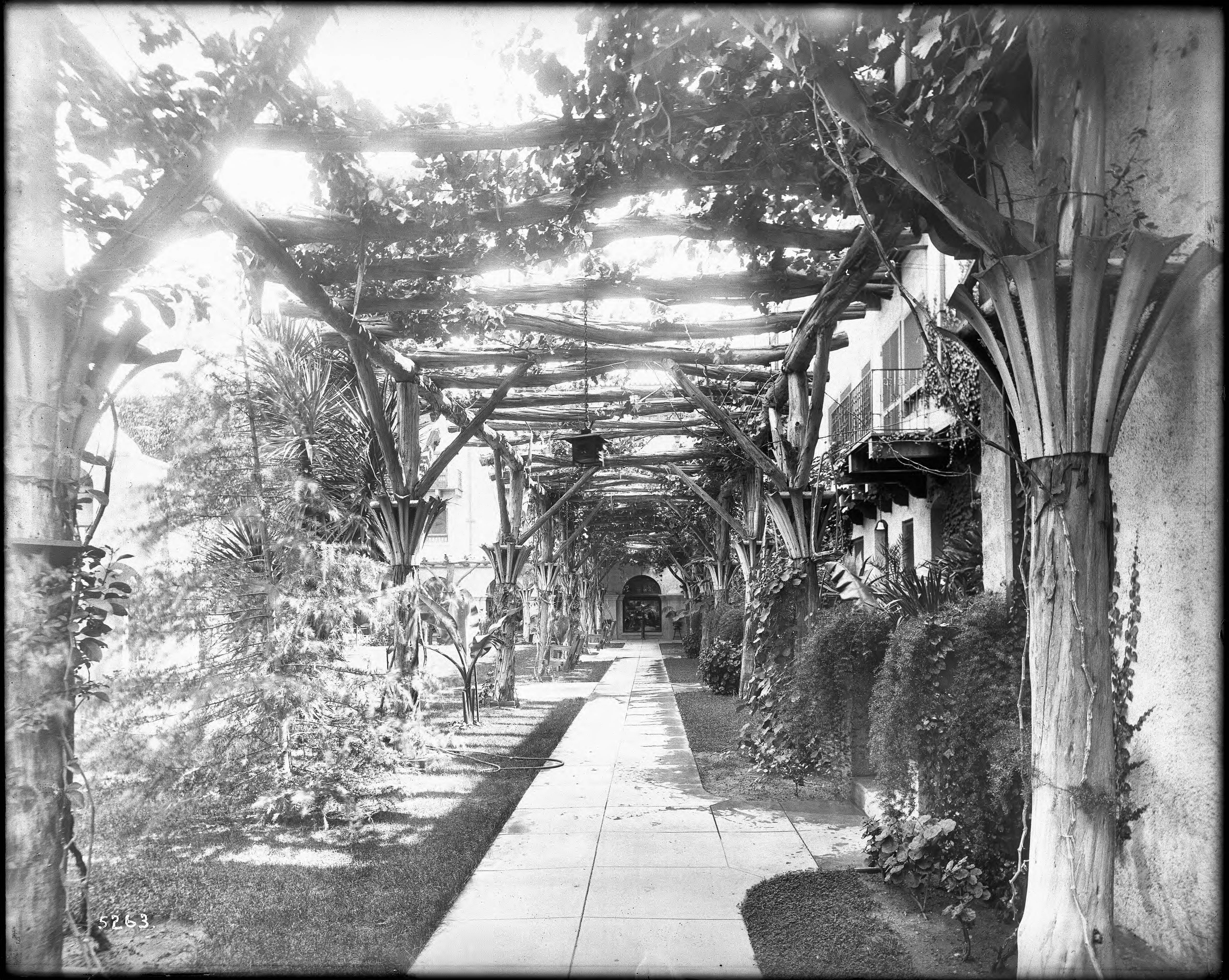
Arcade

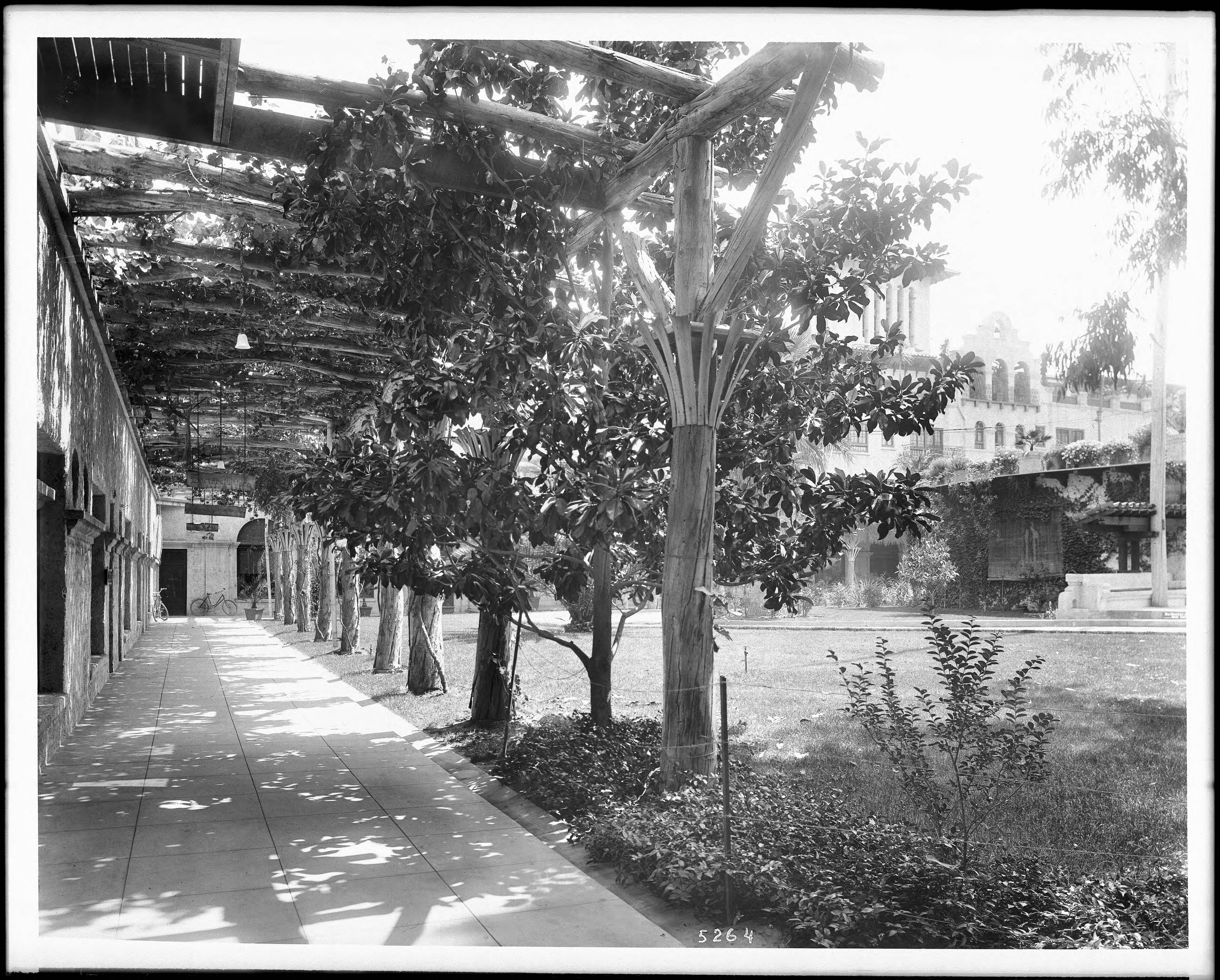

Miller's vision for the eclectic structure was drawn from many historical design periods, revivals, influences, and styles. Some are Spanish Gothic architecture, Mission Revival Style architecture, Moorish Revival architecture, Spanish Colonial style architecture, Spanish Colonial Revival Style architecture, Renaissance Revival architecture, and Mediterranean Revival Style architecture. With one section over another, addition upon addition, the result is a complicated and intricately built structure. It contains narrow passageways, exterior arcades, a medieval-style clock, a five-story rotunda, numerous patios and windows, castle towers, minarets, a Cloister Wing (with an underground Cloister walk), flying buttresses, Mediterranean domes and a pedestrian sky bridge among many other features.

The St. Francis Chapel houses eight, stained-glass windows created by Louis Comfort Tiffany in 1906. The windows were salvaged from the Madison Square Presbyterian Church and the chapel was purpose-built to house them. The Mexican-Baroque styled "Rayas Altar" is 25 feet tall by 16 feet across, carved from cedar and completely covered in gold leaf. For his "Garden of Bells," Miller collected over 800 bells, including one dating from the year 1247 described as the "oldest bell in Christendom."

In 1932, Frank Miller opened the St. Francis Atrio. The "Famous Fliers' Wall", added by Miller's son-in-law DeWitt Hutchings, was used to recognize notable aviators, including Amelia Earhart. On March 20, 1942, World War I ace Eddie Rickenbacker was honored at the inn, becoming the fifty-seventh flier added to the monument. 151 fliers or groups of fliers have been honored by having their signatures etched onto 10-inch-wide (250 mm) copper wings attached to the wall.

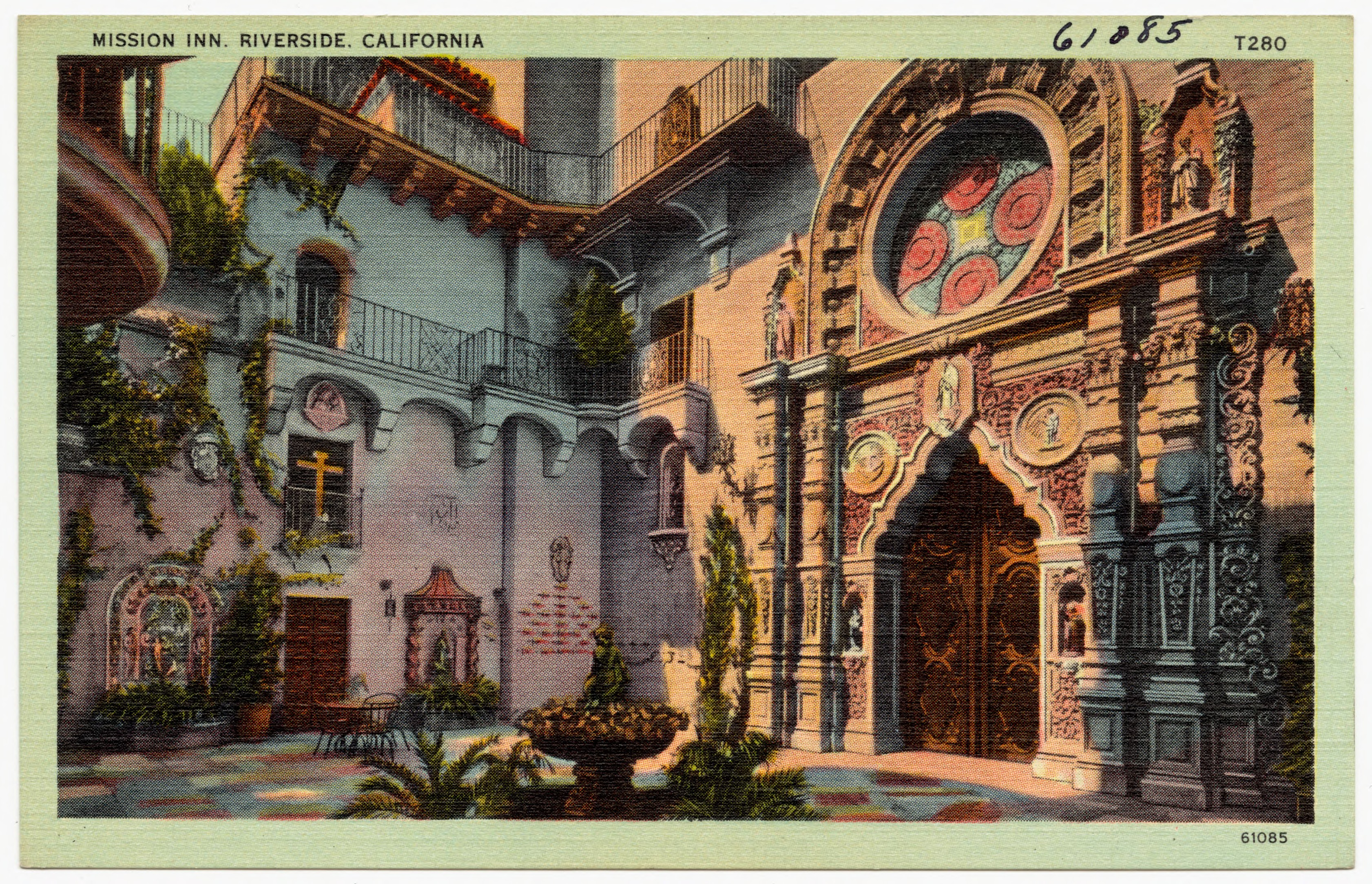
Postcard, c. 1930-1945

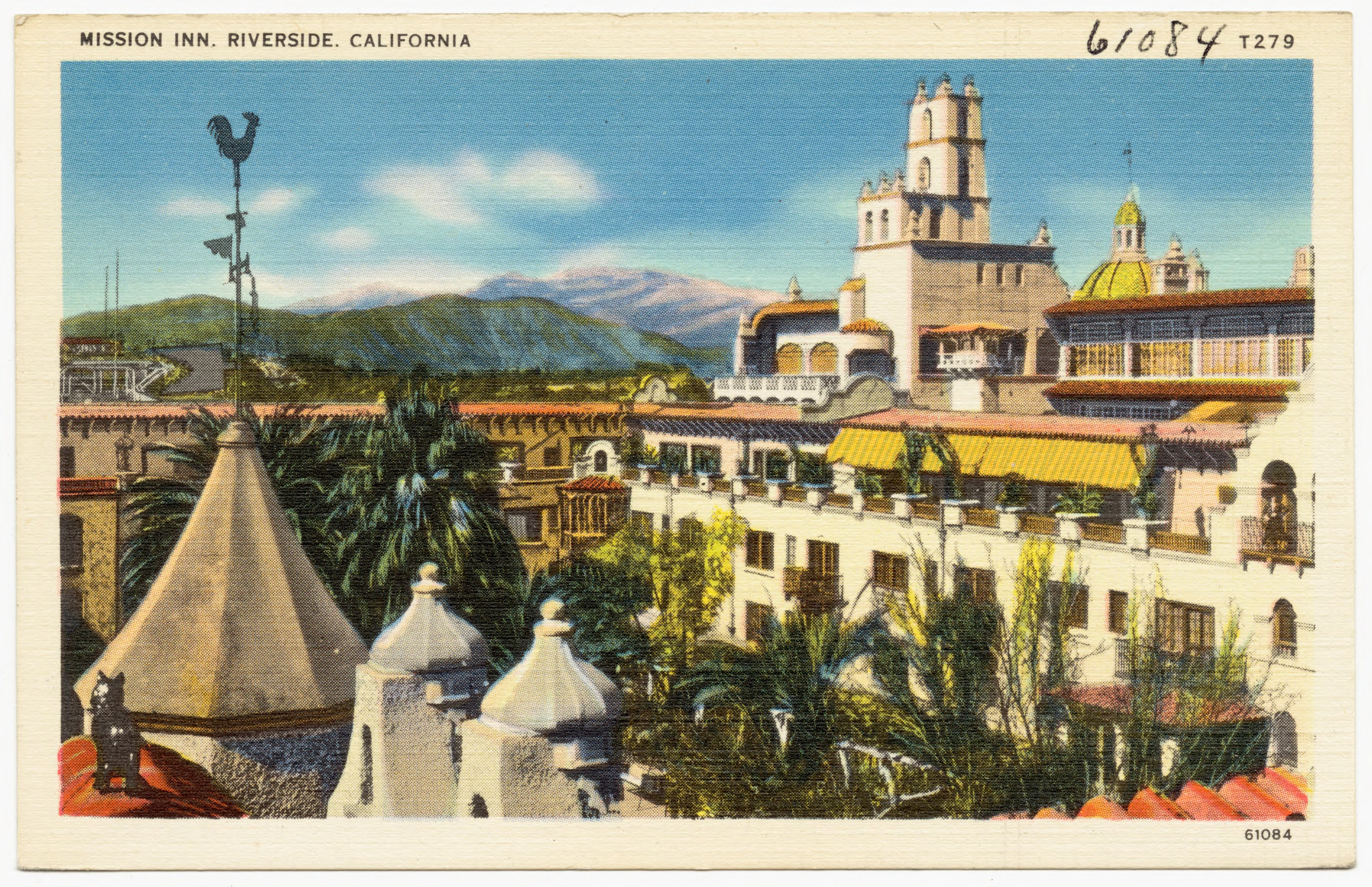
Postcard, c. 1930-1945

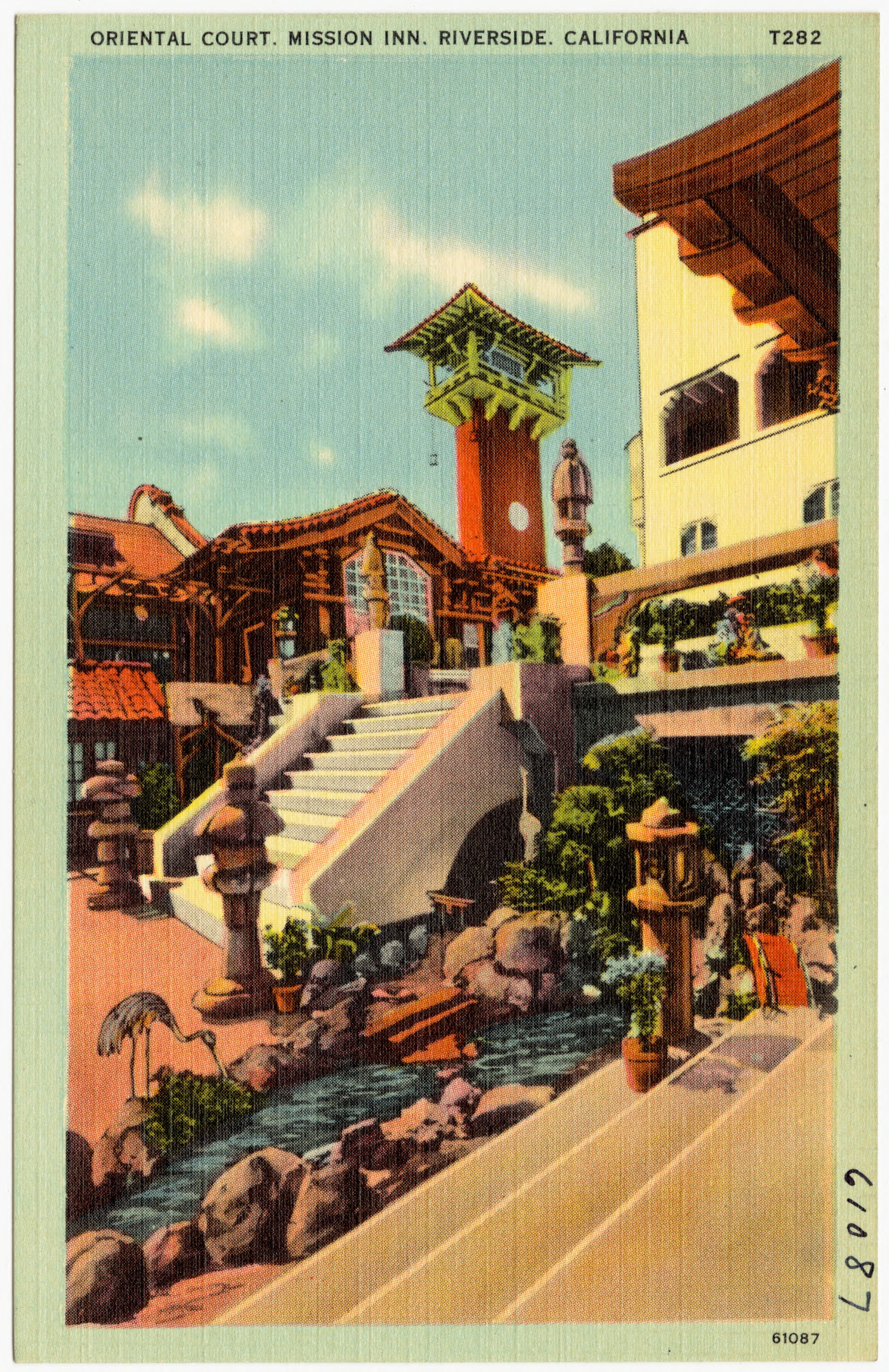
Postcard, c. 1930-1945

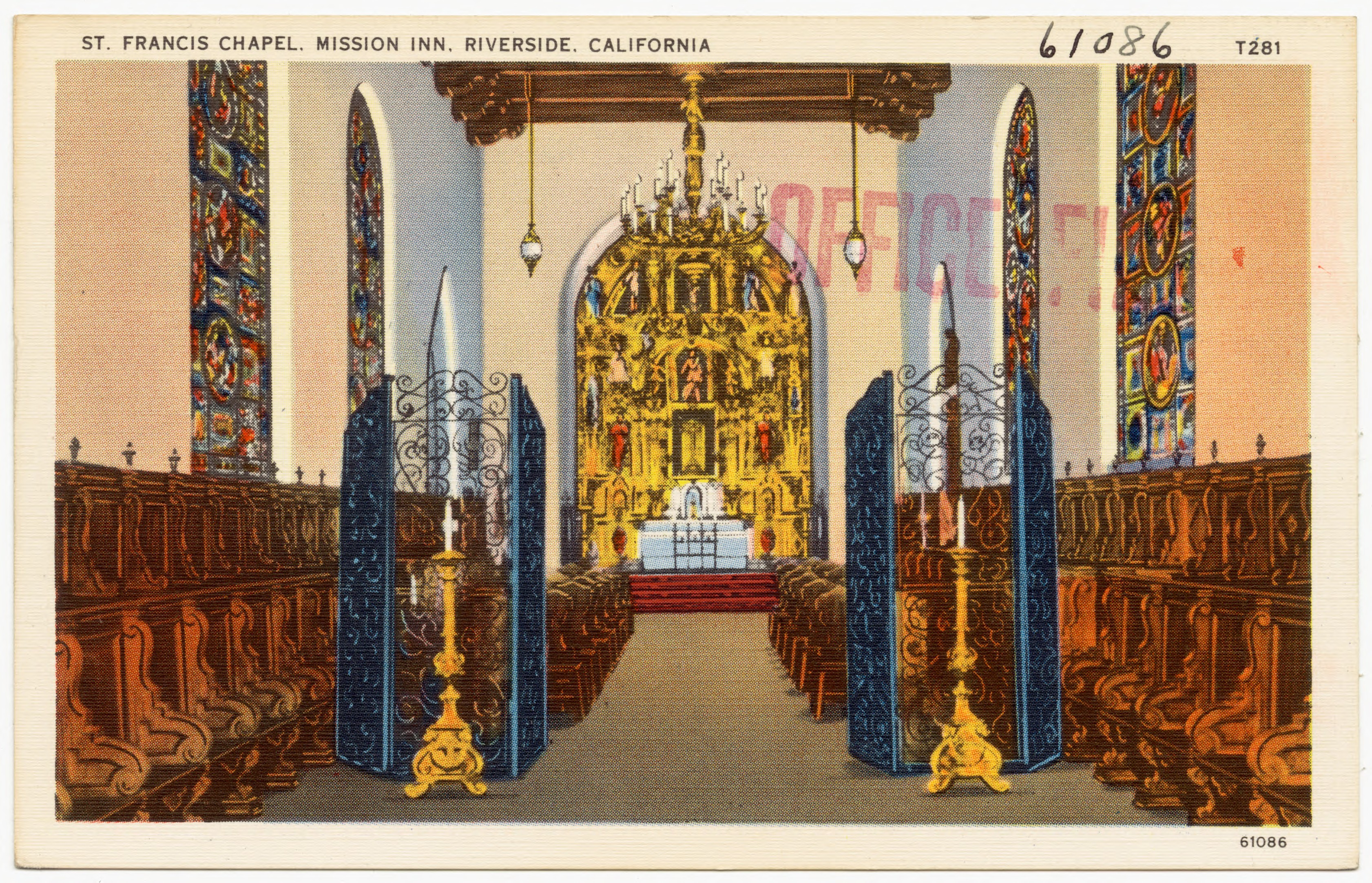
Postcard, c. 1930-1945

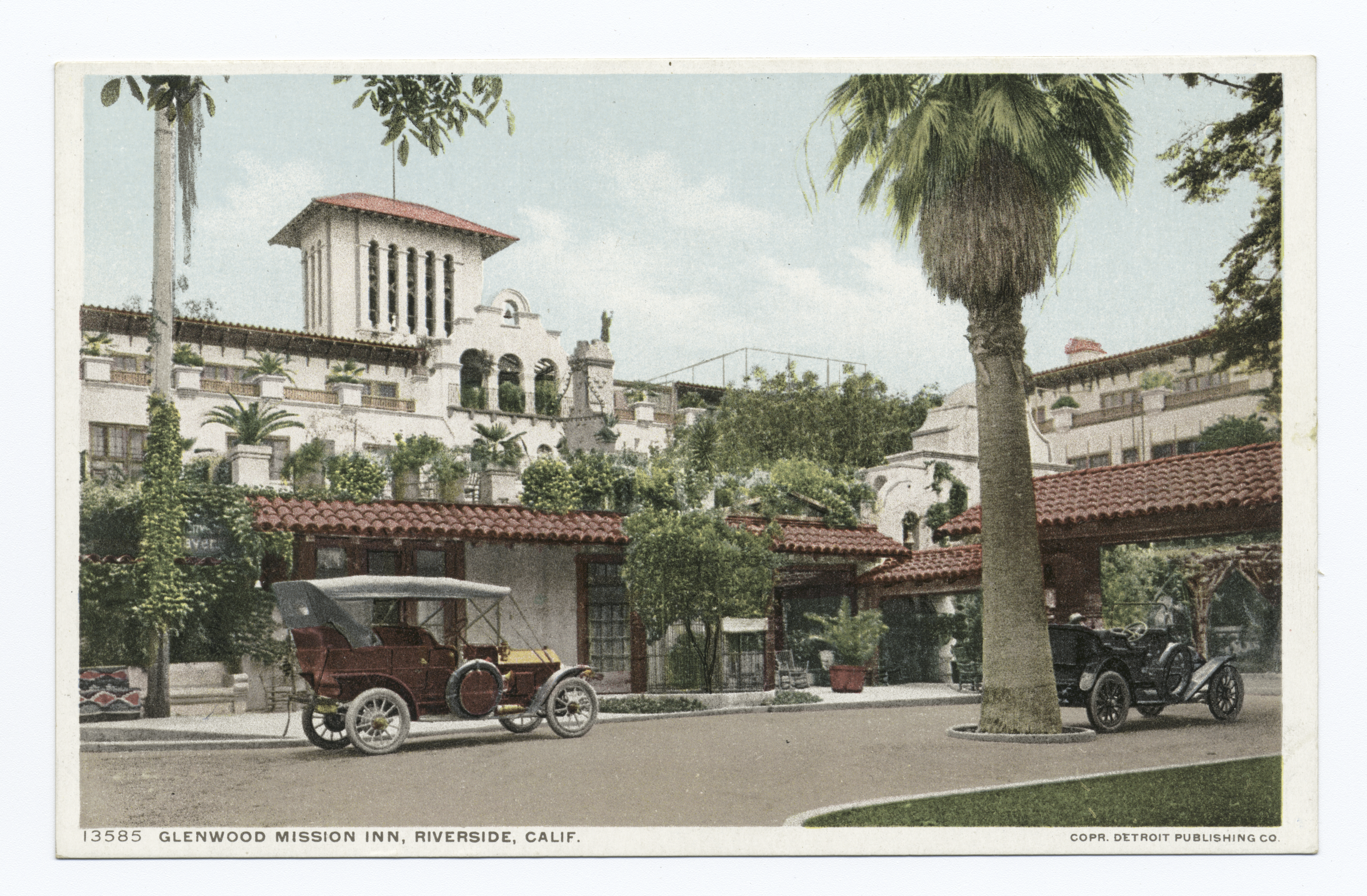
Postcard, date unknown

Frank Miller died in 1935 and the inn continued under the management of his daughter and son-in-law, Allis and DeWitt Hutchings, who died in 1956. The inn then went through a series of ownership changes and some of its older rooms were converted to apartments and used as dorms for UC Riverside. In the early 1960s, St. John's College considered buying it as a location for its western campus but abandoned negotiations when John Gaw Meem donated land in Santa Fe, New Mexico.

Photographed in 1978

During the 1970s and 1980s, the Mission Inn faced significant financial difficulties and deterioration. There were ongoing discussions about possibly demolishing the historic hotel to make way for other developments. The Friends of the Mission Inn helped secure the necessary support to have The Mission Inn designated a National Historic Landmark on May 5, 1977.

The Carley Capital Group began restoring the Mission Inn in 1985. The project faced financial difficulties and was halted in 1988 when Chemical Bank foreclosed on the property. By that time, the Carley Capital Group had already invested an estimated $40 million to $50 million into the restoration efforts.

In 1992, Duane Roberts purchased the Mission Inn Hotel & Spa. Historic Hotels of America announced on August 8, 2024 that Kelly and Duane Roberts had been named recipients of the 2024 Historic Hotels of America Steward of History and Historic Preservation Award.

During the inn's "Festival of Lights" celebration in November 2022, a fire broke out on the roof following the fireworks display.

The owner from 1992 to 2026 was Historic Mission Inn Corporation. Kelly Roberts served as vice chairman and chief operating officer after Duane Roberts’ death on November 1, 2025. On May 4, 2026, Yuhaaviatam of San Manuel Nation announced a deal to purchase the hotel. Documents filed with the County of Riverside show the transaction was for $33.2 million.

== Architecture ==
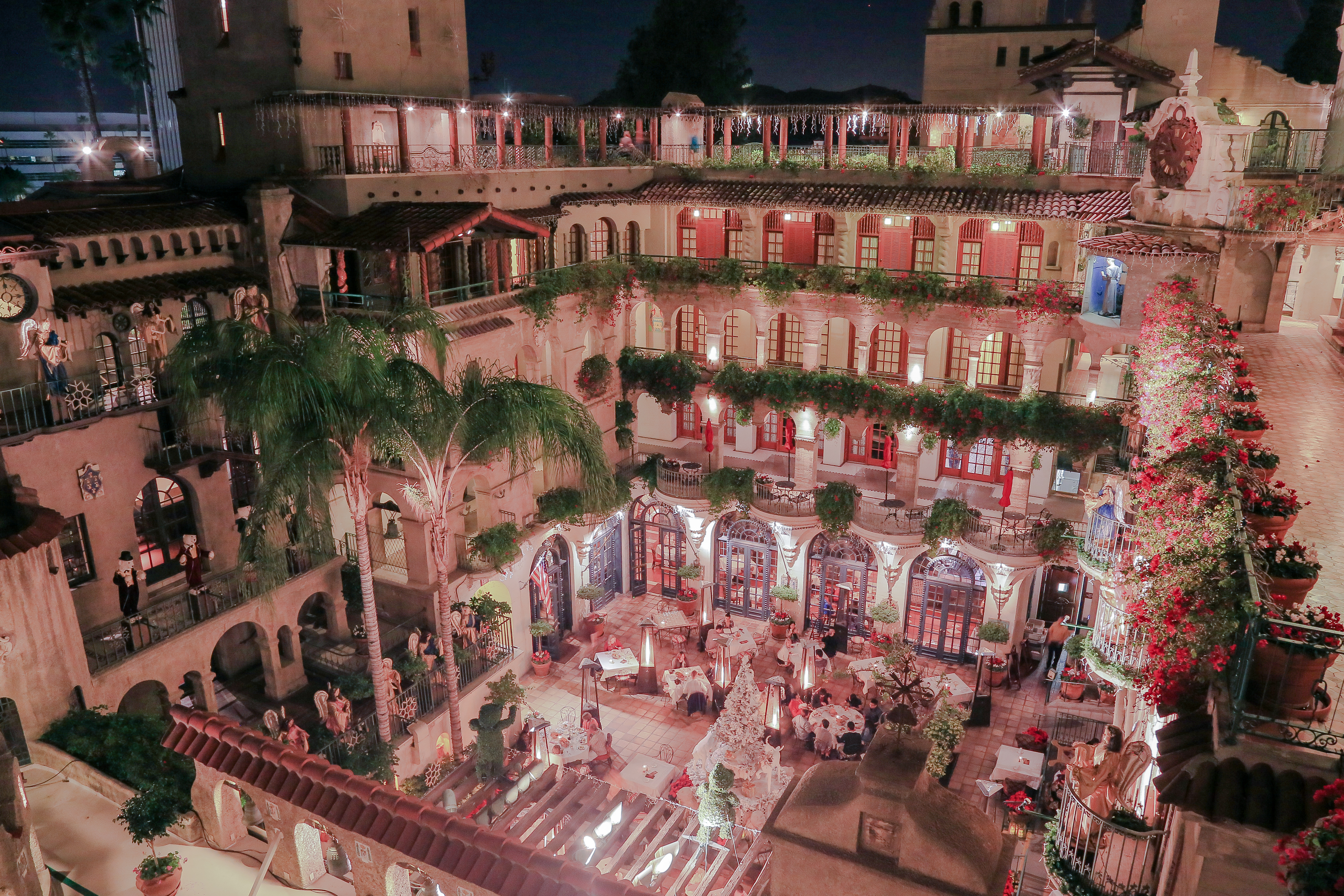
Mission Inn courtyard during Festival of Lights

The Mission Inn was designed by multiple architects in a range of architectural styles. Frank Miller selected Arthur Burnett Benton to design the 1903 “Mission Wing” in a primarily Mission Revival style, and the 1911 Cloister Wing. Myron Hunt designed the 1914 Spanish Wing, incorporating a Spanish Colonial Revival theme. Benton returned for the 1924 rooftop Alhambra Court and suites for Frank Miller and Alice Richardson, Miller’s sister and hotel manager. G. Stanley Wilson, along with his lead designer Peter J. Weber, added the 1928 Authors’ Row and the 1931 International Rotunda Wing, including the St. Francis Chapel and the Court of the Orient, integrating a range of styles from Spanish Renaissance Revival to Gothic Revival in an exuberant “old world” fantasy mélange.

== Notable guests ==
For 120 years, the Mission Inn has been the center of Riverside, host to U.S. Presidents, celebrities, a number of seasonal and holiday functions, as well as occasional political functions and other major social gatherings. Pat and Richard Nixon were married in what is now the Presidential Lounge, Nancy and Ronald Reagan honeymooned there, and eight other U.S. presidents have visited the inn: Benjamin Harrison, William McKinley, Theodore Roosevelt, William Howard Taft, Herbert Hoover, John F. Kennedy, Gerald Ford, and George W. Bush.

Social leaders who have stopped at the Mission Inn include Susan B. Anthony, Henry Ford, Andrew Carnegie, John D. Rockefeller, Henry Huntington, Albert Einstein, Joseph Pulitzer, William Randolph Hearst, Hubert H. Bancroft, Harry Chandler, Booker T. Washington, Helen Keller and John Muir.

The list of entertainers who have toured the inn is extensive. Lillian Russell, Sarah Bernhardt and Harry Houdini were early visitors to Frank Miller's hotel. Other guests have included actors such as Ethel Barrymore, Charles Boyer, Eddie Cantor, Mary Pickford, Ginger Rogers, Bette Davis (who was married at the inn in 1945), W.C. Fields, Clark Gable, Cary Grant, Spencer Tracy, Fess Parker, James Brolin and Barbra Streisand, Raquel Welch and Drew Barrymore.

== Popular culture ==
In 1909 Carrie Jacobs-Bond wrote the lyrics for her song "A Perfect Day" while staying in the Mission Inn. For many years the Mission Inn's carillon played "A Perfect Day" as the last tune each evening.

The inn's architecture and ambiance have attracted many film makers. Film shoots at the inn include 1938's Idiot's Delight with Clark Gable, 1951's The First Legion with Charles Boyer, 1969's Tell Them Willie Boy Is Here with Robert Redford, 1975's The Wild Party with Raquel Welch and James Coco, Billy Wilder's 1981 comedy Buddy Buddy with Jack Lemmon and Walter Matthau, 1988's Vibes with Jeff Goldblum, and 1977's Black Samurai with Jim Kelly.

In 1982, Eddie Money filmed the music video of "Think I'm in Love" at the inn.

The finale of the 1973–74 TV series The Magician season 1 episode "Man on Fire" was shot extensively in the Mission Inn, which was supposedly "under renovation".

Tears for Fears shot their music video for the song "Raoul and the Kings of Spain" there in 1995.

== Gallery ==
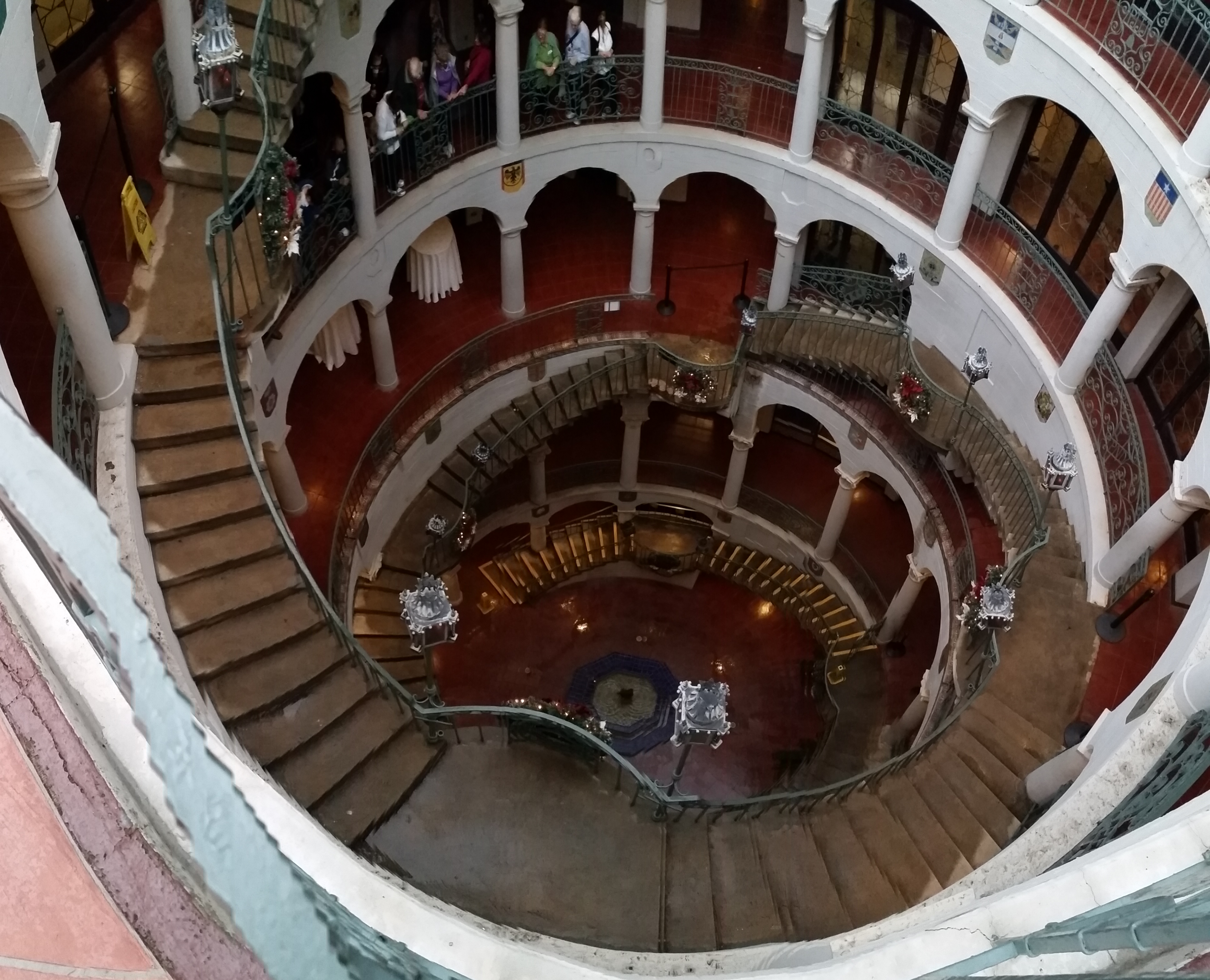
International Rotunda, originally used as professional offices.

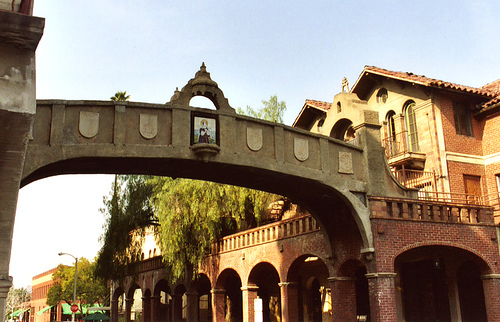
Sixth Street Bridge between the St. Francis Atrio and the Mission Inn Annex.

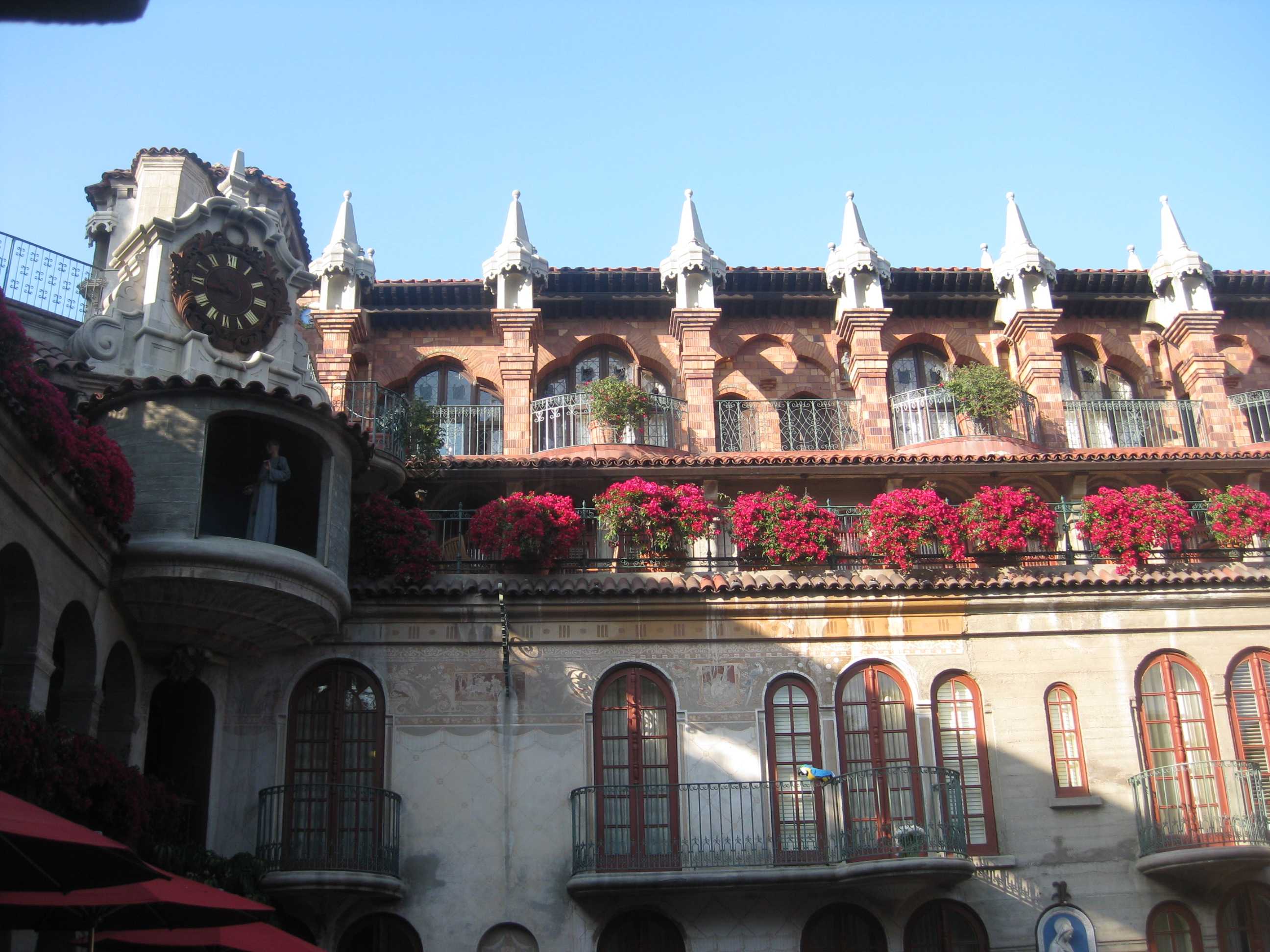
Spanish Patio.

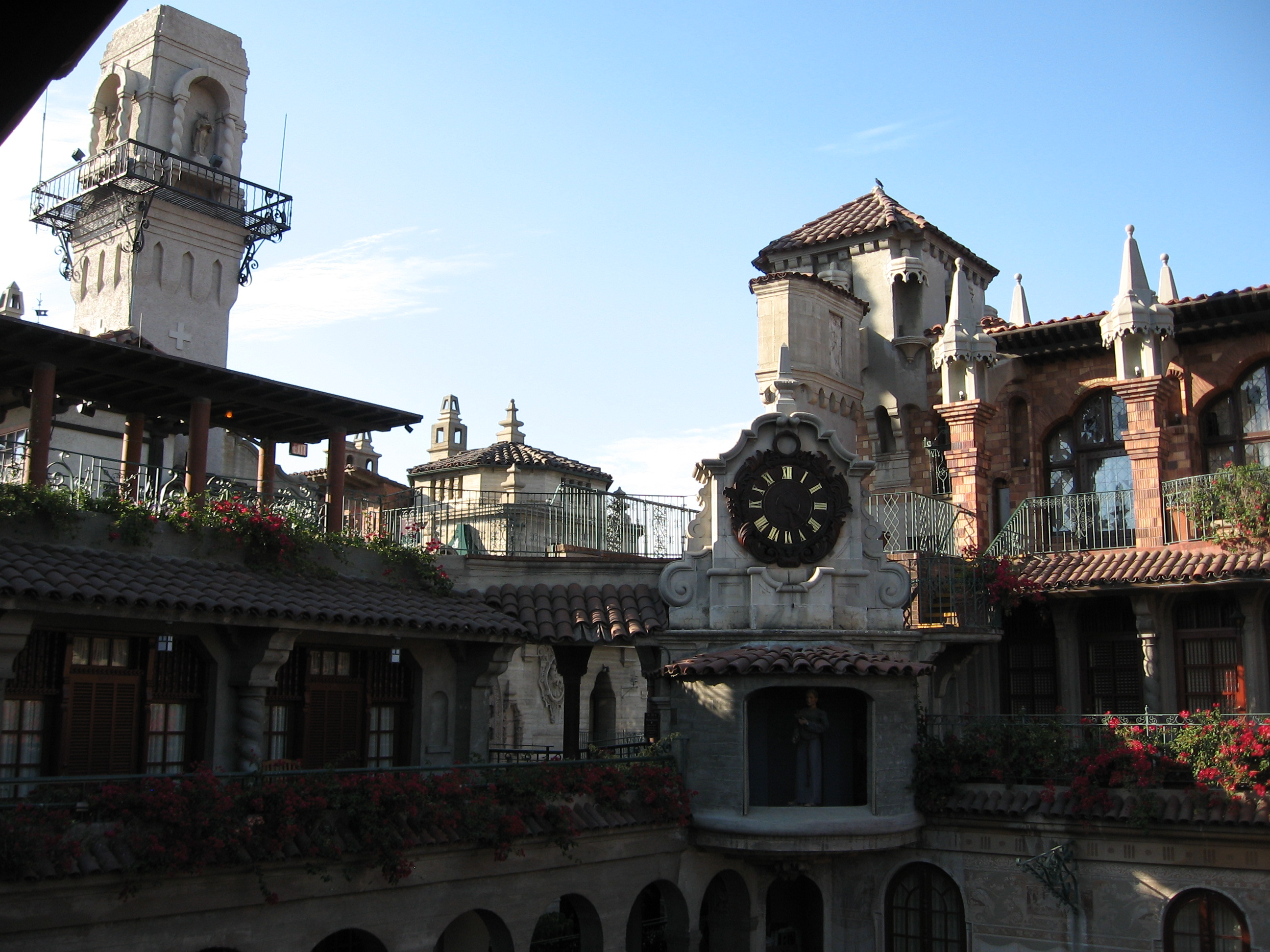
Anton Clock and Spanish Wing.

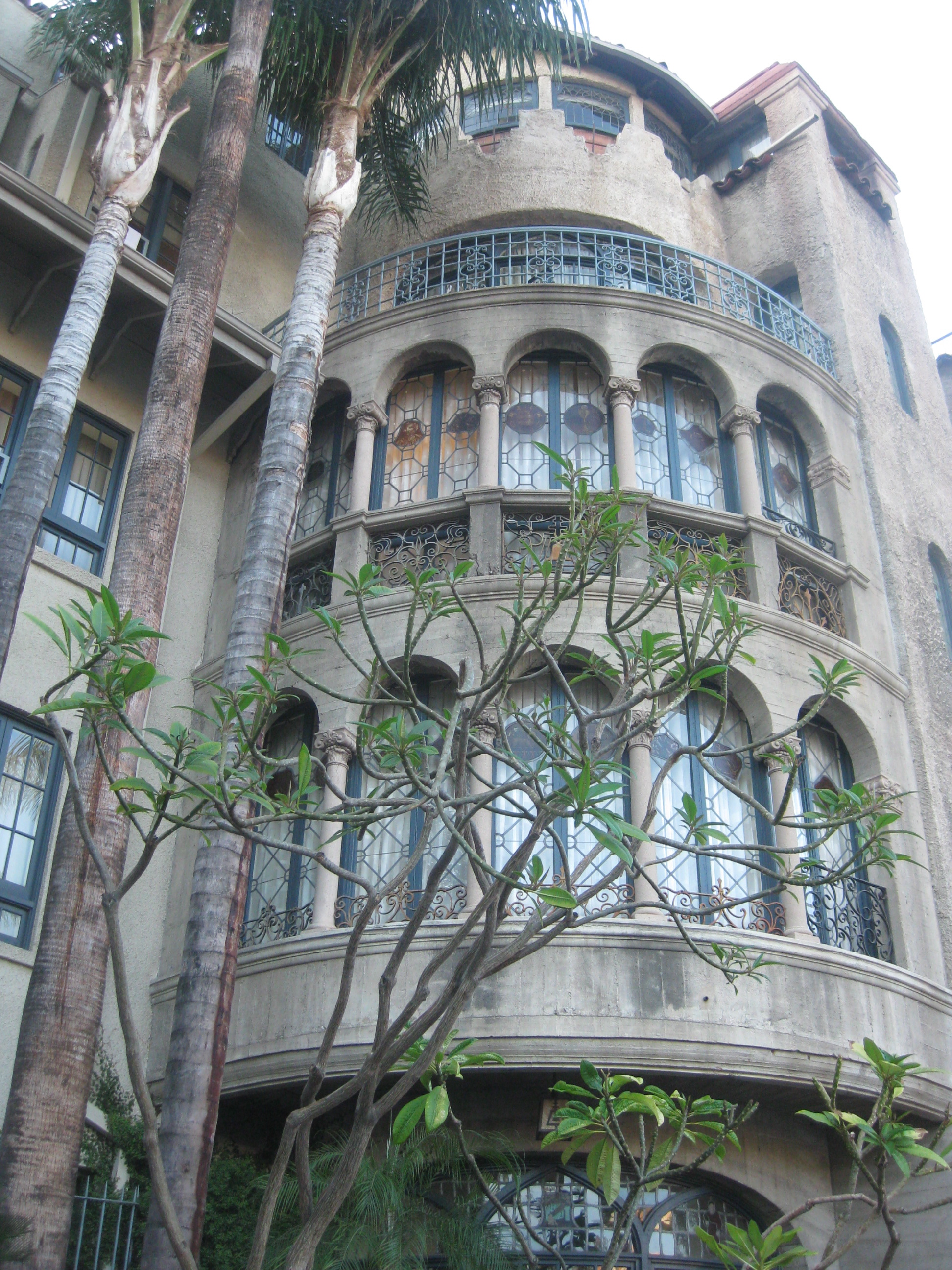
Leaded glass windows

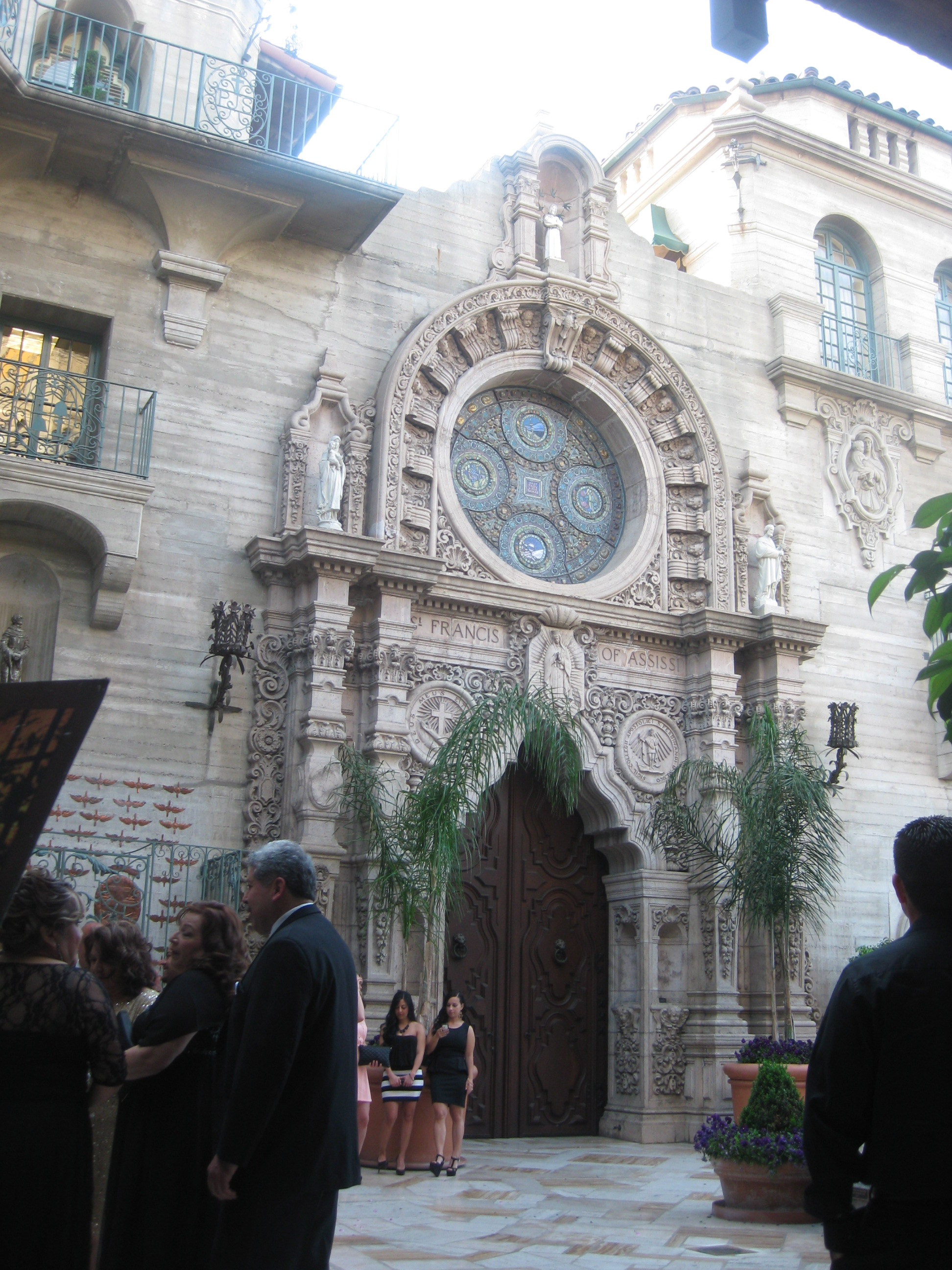
St. Francis Chapel.

== See also ==
- Mount Rubidoux – a city park in Riverside developed from land donated by the Miller family
