= Pavey =

Pavey is an English surname. Notable people with the surname include:

- Alfie Pavey (born 1995), British footballer
- Bill Pavey (1913–1982), Australian rules footballer
- Celia Pavey, birth name of Vera Blue (born 1994), Australian musician
- Charles W. Pavey (1835–1910), American businessman and politician
- Iris Pavey Gilmore (1900-1982), American author
- Jo Pavey (born 1973), British long-distance runner
- Kenny Pavey (born 1979), British footballer
- Max Pavey (1918–1957), American chess master and medical doctor
- Melinda Pavey (born 1969), Australian politician
- Şafak Pavey (born 1976), Turkish diplomat, columnist and politician
- Simon Pavey (born 1967), Australian off-road motorcycle racer
- Stanley Pavey (1913–1984), British cinematographer
- Blake Pavey (Born 2002), Australian Comedian
- Geoff Pavey (Born 1993) British Structural Engineer and Professional Mixed Martial artist
