= P.E.O. Sisterhood =

Education organization based in Des Moines, US

- Formation: January 21, 1869; 157 years ago
- Founded at: Iowa Wesleyan University
- Type: Philanthropic
- Headquarters: 3700 Grand Avenue
- Location: Des Moines, United States
- Publication: P.E.O. Record
- Website: www.peointernational.org

The P.E.O. Sisterhood (Philanthropic Educational Organization) is a U.S.-based international women's organization of more than 182,000 members, with a primary focus on providing educational opportunities for female students worldwide. The Sisterhood is headquartered in Des Moines, Iowa, with chapters throughout the United States and Canada. Among other projects, it owns and supports Cottey College, an independent college for women in Nevada, Missouri

== History ==
The Sisterhood was founded on January 21, 1869, as a seven-member sorority at Iowa Wesleyan University in Mount Pleasant, Iowa. It was the second sorority to be founded in the U.S., after I. C. Sorosis (now known as Pi Beta Phi) in Monmouth, Illinois in April 1867. The founding members were Mary Allen [Stafford] (1848–1927), Ella Stewart (1848–94), Alice Bird Babb (1850–1926), Hattie Briggs [Bousquet] (1849–77), Franc Roads [Elliott] (1852–1924), Alice Virginia Coffin (1848–88), and Suela Pearson [Penfield] (1851–1920). The sisterhood was founded after some of these seven girls were invited to join a chapter of I. C. Sorosis organized in Mount Pleasant a month earlier. But they would not join without their other friends and decided to organize their own sorority.

The organization was originally rooted in the philosophy and institutions of the Methodist Church, which actively promoted women's rights and education in America during the 19th century.

Further chapters were founded, and in 1883 local chapters of the P.E.O. founded a "Supreme Chapter" to coordinate the Sisterhood on a national level. The first International chapter (i.e. outside the United States) was established in Vancouver, British Columbia, Canada in 1911.

Although P.E.O. began as a collegiate sorority at Iowa Wesleyan, tensions developed between that original chapter and the wider body. In 1902 the Iowa Wesleyan chapter left P.E.O., to be reconstituted as the second chapter of Alpha Xi Delta (founded in 1893 at Lombard College, Illinois). Since then, P.E.O. has been essentially a community-based organization.

== Symbols and traditions ==
For much of its history, the meaning of "P.E.O." in the organization's name was a closely guarded secret and was never made public. In 1924, it was said that "These letters are 'mystic'. None save the initiated know their meaning." The organization's avoidance of publicity, and the secrecy of its name, caused it to be regarded as a "secret society".

In 2005, the Sisterhood unveiled a new logo and an "It's OK to Talk About P.E.O." campaign, which sought to raise the public profile of the organization while nonetheless maintaining its traditions of secrecy. In 2008, it revised its website to indicate that "P.E.O." now publicly stands for "Philanthropic Educational Organization". However, the Sisterhood acknowledges that "P.E.O." originally had a different meaning that continues to be "reserved for members only", and so the public meaning is not the only one.

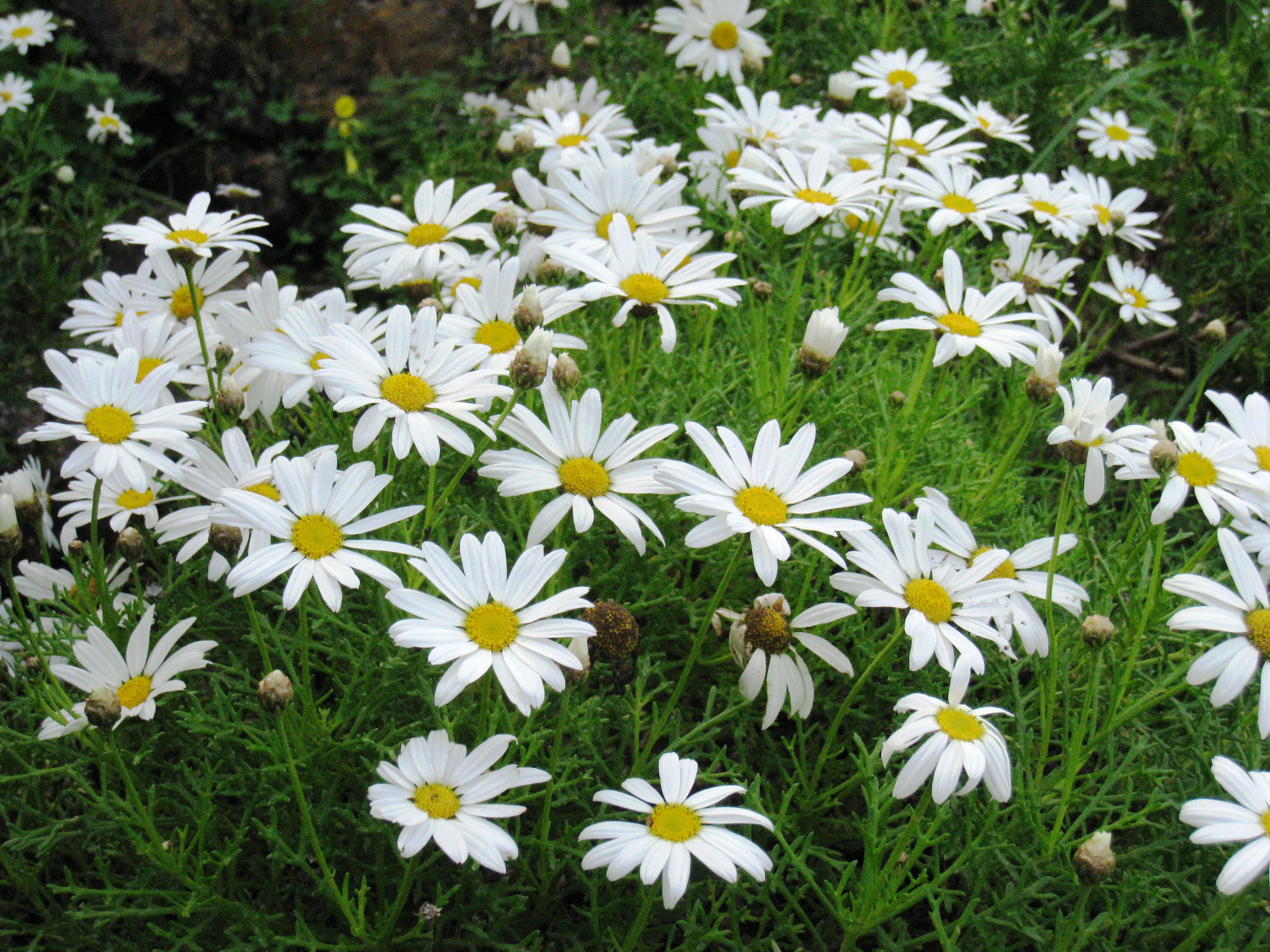
The marguerite daisy, the P.E.O. flower

At her initiation, every member receives a P.E.O. emblem, a five-pointed star. Members are encouraged to wear their emblems on January 21, Founders' Day. The emblem is lent to the individual for as long as she remains an active member of a chapter. On her death, it may be buried with her if she has requested this in writing; otherwise, it is to be returned to her chapter or to the P.E.O. Executive.

The P.E.O. official flower is the marguerite daisy.

Membership in P.E.O. is by invitation but is not secret. Meetings for members are, however, highly guarded and a secret password must be used to prove membership. They are opened with prayers and with inspirational readings chosen by members, but P.E.O. meetings and activities do not require any particular religion or religious practice, except for a belief in God. Meetings follow a structured agenda, but do not involve religious rites, and do not meet any formal definition of "ritualistic".

== Activities ==
P.E.O.'s core mission is to promote educational opportunities for women. It has six philanthropic projects, which include Cottey College, an independent, liberal arts and sciences college for women. Five programs provide assistance to women for higher education: P.E.O. Educational Loan Fund, P.E.O. International Peace Scholarship Fund, P.E.O. Program for Continuing Education, P.E.O. Scholar Awards, and P.E.O. STAR Scholarship.

As of July 2026, The P.E.O. Sisterhood is a nonprofit organization that has helped more than 122,000 women pursue educational goals by providing over $490 million in educational assistance, making a difference in women’s lives through six philanthropies and a foundation:

- P.E.O. Educational Loan Fund (ELF) — A Revolving Loan Fund established in 1907 to lend money to qualified women students to assist them in securing a higher education. Has loaned $282.6 million.
- P.E.O. International Peace Scholarship (IPS) — A fund established in 1949 to provide scholarships for international women students to pursue graduate study in the U.S. and Canada. Has provided $54.6 million in scholarships.
- P.E.O. Program for Continuing Education (PCE) — Established in 1973 to provide need-based grants to women in the U.S. and Canada whose education has been interrupted and who find it necessary to return to school to support themselves and/or their families. Has given $83 million in grants.
- P.E.O. Scholar Awards (PSA) — Established in 1991 to provide substantial merit-based awards for women of the U.S. and Canada who are pursuing a doctoral-level degree at an accredited college or university. Has awarded $42.1 million in scholarships.
- P.E.O. STAR Scholarship (STAR) — Established in 2009 to provide scholarships for exceptional women in their final year of high school to attend an accredited postsecondary educational institution in the U.S. or Canada in the next academic year. Has given $27.8 million in scholarships.
- Cottey College — A nationally ranked, fully accredited, independent, liberal arts and sciences college for women located in Nevada, Missouri, has been supported by P.E.O. since 1927 and offers baccalaureate degrees in a variety of majors. Cottey College, a debt-free institution, welcomes women from around the world.

== Membership ==
Membership in P.E.O. is by invitation but is not secret. In 1966, the Sisterhood had 130,000 members. At that time membership was open to women over the age of eighteen, who believed in God and had lived at their present address for a least a year. It was said to appeal to "Protestant women of some social standing and college education". Membership peaked in 1999 with over 252,000 dues paying members.

Although always officially nonsectarian, P.E.O. has evolved over recent generations into a diverse, community-based organization with over 5,200 chapters in the U.S. and Canada.

== Notable members ==
- Laura Chenoweth Butz, educator
- Saidie Orr Dunbar, nurse
- Isabel H. Ellis, clubwoman
- Iris Pavey Gilmore, writer
- Kate Wetzel Jameson, dean of women at Montana State University, the University of Arizona, and Oregon State College
- Jeanette Lawrence, writer
- Ona F. Meens, academic administrator
- Sara E. Morse, school superintendent
- Edith Allen Phelps, librarian
- Effie Hoffman Rogers, educator and newspaper editor
- Rachel Irene Seibert, clubwoman
- Jeannette Throckmorton (1883-1963), physician

=== Founders' portraits ===
In the 1920s, the P.E.O. commissioned a set of portraits in oil of its seven founders from Marion Dunlap Harper. The paintings were unveiled in P.E.O. Memorial Hall in Mount Pleasant on September 23, 1929. They are composites sourced from a collection of sketches, portraits and photographs: those of Alice Coffin and Franc Roads are based on photographs taken at the same studio, and they are wearing the same cape.

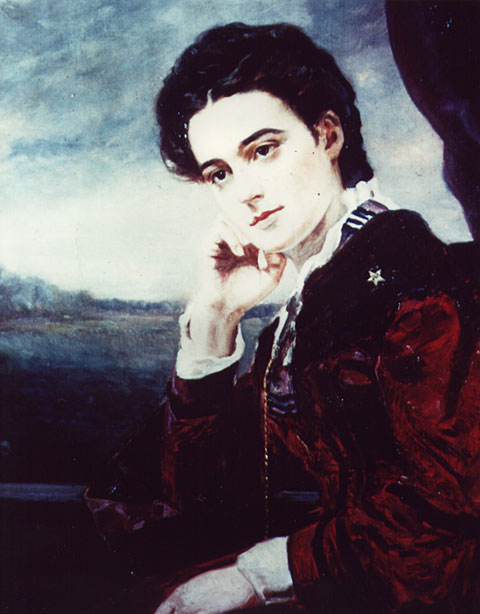
Alice Bird Babb (May 8, 1850 – November 21, 1926)

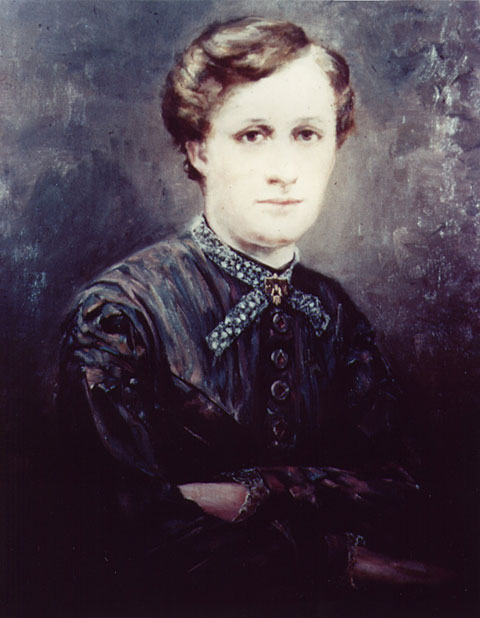
Mary Allen Stafford (December 30, 1848 – July 10, 1927)

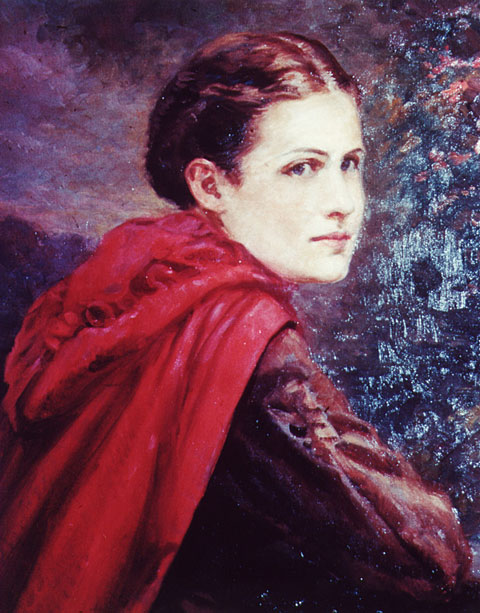
Franc Roads Elliot (February 10, 1852 – August 9, 1924)

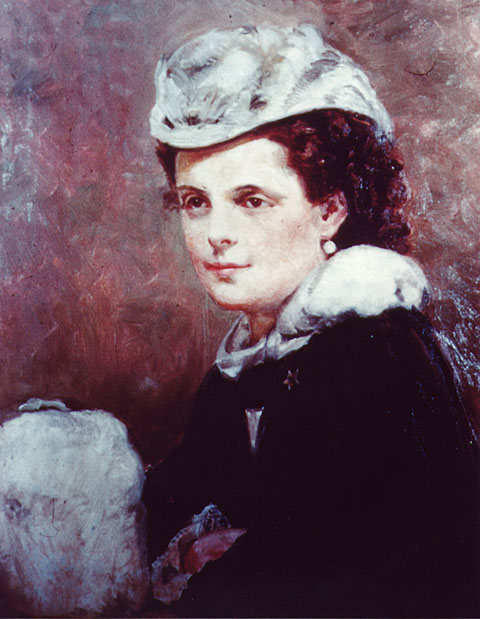
Suela Pearson Penfield (August 24, 1851 – September 20, 1920)

Ella Stewart (May 8, 1848 – December 12, 1894)

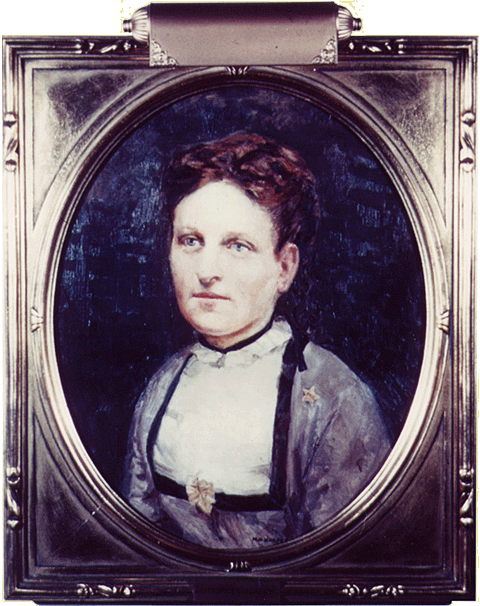
Hattie Briggs Bousquet (October 10, 1849 – June 22, 1877)

Alice Coffin (March 29, 1848 – July 28, 1888)

== Sources ==
- Clapp, Stella (1968). Out Of The Heart: A Century of P.E.O. 1869–1969. Des Moines, Iowa: P.E.O. Sisterhood.
- Moudry, Susan (October 2013). "'A society of our own': Methodists, coeducation and the founding of P.E.O.". Methodist History. 52 (1): 33–42.
- Preuss, Arthur (1924). A Dictionary of Secret and Other Societies. St. Louis: B. Herder Book Co. pp. 395–396.
