= Mayoral elections in Riverside, California =

Elections are held in Riverside, California to elect the city's mayor. Currently, such elections are nonpartisan and are regularly scheduled to elect mayors to four-year terms.

== 1997 ==
Riverside, California mayoral election, 1997
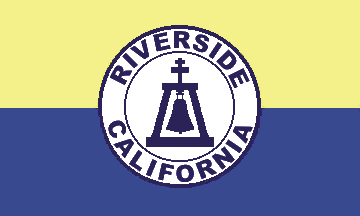
- November 4, 1997
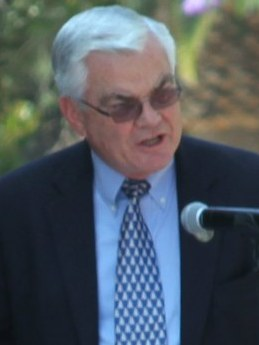

Candidate	Ronald O. Loveridge	Terry Frizzel
Party	Non-partisan	Non-partisan
Popular vote	14,331	5,680
Percentage	56.80%	22.51%
Mayor before election
Ronald O. Loveridge
Elected mayor
Ronald O. Loveridge

The 1997 Riverside, California mayoral election was held on November 4, 1997, to elect the mayor of Riverside, California. It saw the reelection of Ronald O. Loveridge.

=== Candidates ===
- Terry Frizzel, businesswoman and former mayor of Riverside (1990–1994)
- Ronald O. Loveridge, incumbent mayor and college teacher
- Gary R. Supek, quality analyst
- Steven Portillo Torres, "politicalist", speaker, and collegiate

=== Results ===
1997 Riverside mayoral election results
Candidate	Votes	%
Ron Loveridge (incumbent)	14,331	56.80
Teresa "Terry" Frizzel	5,680	22.51
Steven Portillo Torres	706	2.80
Gary R. Huspek	643	2.55
Total votes	25,229	100

== 2001 ==
Riverside, California mayoral election, 2001
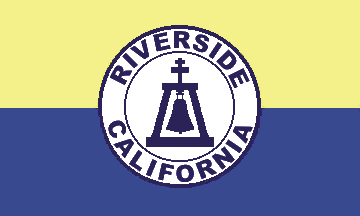
- November 6, 2001
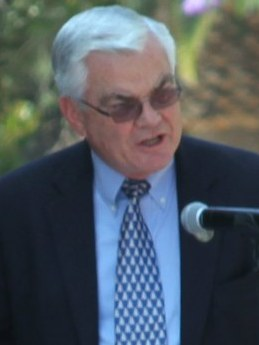

Candidate	Ronald O. Loveridge	Sam Cardelucci
Party	Non-partisan	Non-partisan
Popular vote	14,560	5,625
Percentage	55.23%	21.34%
Candidate	Letitia Pepper	Peter G. Weber
Party	Non-partisan	Non-partisan
Popular vote	4,843	1,336
Percentage	18.37%	5.07%
Mayor before election
Ronald O. Loveridge
Elected mayor
Ronald O. Loveridge

The 2001 Riverside, California mayoral election was held on November 6, 2001, to elect the mayor of Riverside, California. It saw the reelection of Ronald O. Loveridge to a third term.

=== Candidates ===
- Sam Cardelucci, owner of National Environmental Waste Co.
- Ronald O. Loveridge, incumbent mayor and college teacher
- Letitia Pepper, attorney and teacher
- Peter G. Weber, manufacturing manager

=== Results ===
2001 Riverside mayoral election results
Candidate	Votes	%
Ron Loveridge (incumbent)	14,560	55.23
Samuel D. "Sam" Cardelucci	5,625	21.34
Letitia Pepper	4,843	18.37
Peter G. Weber	1,336	5.07
Total votes	26,364	100

== 2005 ==
Riverside, California mayoral election, 2005
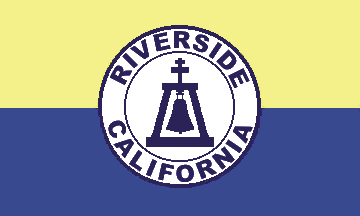
- November 8, 2005
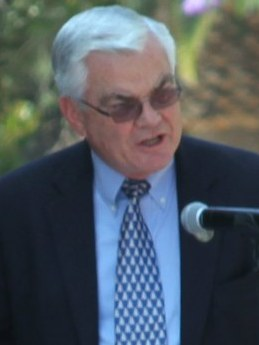

Candidate	Ronald O. Loveridge	Terry Frizzel
Party	Non-partisan	Non-partisan
Popular vote	29,092	10,515
Percentage	60.14%	21.74%
Candidate	Ameal Moore
Party	Non-partisan
Popular vote	8,658
Percentage	17.90%
Mayor before election
Ronald O. Loveridge
Elected mayor
Ronald O. Loveridge

The 2005 Riverside, California mayoral election was held on November 8, 2005, to elect the mayor of Riverside, California. It saw the reelection of Ronald O. Loveridge to a fourth term.

=== Candidates ===
- Terry Frizzel, former mayor of Riverside (1990–1994)
- Ronald O. Loveridge, incumbent mayor and college teacher
- Ameal Moore

=== Results ===
2005 Riverside mayoral election results
Candidate	Votes	%
Ron Loveridge (incumbent)	29,092	60.14
Teresa R. "Terry" Frizzel	10,515	21.74
Ameal Moore	8,658	17.91
Write-ins	105	0.22
Total votes	48,370	100

== 2009 ==
Riverside, California mayoral election, 2009
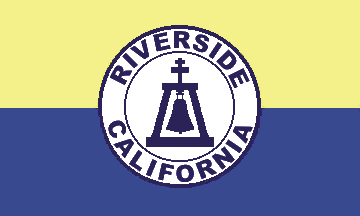
- November 3, 2009
- Turnout: 18.97%
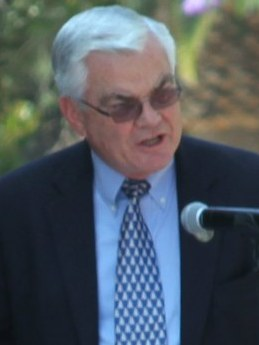

Candidate	Ronald O. Loveridge	Art Gage
Party	Non-partisan	Non-partisan
Popular vote	14,387	6,421
Percentage	67.74%	30.23%
Mayor before election
Ronald O. Loveridge
Elected mayor
Ronald O. Loveridge

The 2009 Riverside, California mayoral election was held on November 3, 2009, to elect the mayor of Riverside, California. It saw the reelection of Ronald O. Loveridge to a fifth term.

=== Results ===
2009 Riverside mayoral election results
Candidate	Votes	%
Ron Loveridge (incumbent)	14,387	67.74%
Art Gage	6,421	30.23%
Total votes	21,240	100%
Turnout	{{{votes}}}	18.97%

== 2012 ==
Riverside, California mayoral election, 2012
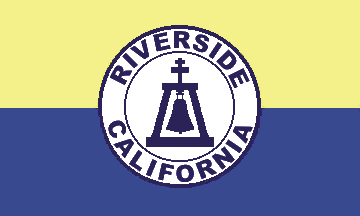
- June 5, 2012 (first round); November 6, 2012 (runoff)
Candidate	Rusty Bailey	Ed Adkison
Party	Non-partisan	Non-partisan
First-round vote	10,112	8,345
First-round percentage	30.63%	25.28%
Second-round vote	47,098	33,889
Second-round percentage	58.16%	41.84%
Candidate	Mike Gardner	Andy Melendrez
Party	Non-partisan	Non-partisan
First-round vote	5,144	4,461
First-round percentage	15.58%	13.51%
Mayor before election
Ronald Loveridge
Elected mayor
Rusty Bailey

The 2012 Riverside, California mayoral election was held on April 9, 2012, and June 5, 2012, and November 6, 2012, to elect the mayor of Riverside, California. It saw the election of Rusty Bailey.

Incumbent mayor Ronald Loveridge opted against running for a sixth term.

=== Results ===
First round

2012 Riverside mayoral election first round results
Candidate	Votes	%
Rusty Bailey	10,112	30.63
Ed Adkison	8,345	25.28
Mike Gardner	5,144	15.58
Andy Melendrez	4,461	13.51
Dvonne M. Pitruzzello	1,138	3.45
Aurora Chavez	1,122	3.40
Peter Benavidez	668	2.02
Total votes	33,017	100
Turnout	{{{votes}}}	27.57%

Runoff

2012 Riverside mayoral election runoff results
Candidate	Votes	%
Rusty Bailey	47,098	58.16
Ed Adkison	33,889	41.84
Total votes	80,987	100

== 2016 ==
Riverside, California mayoral election, 2016
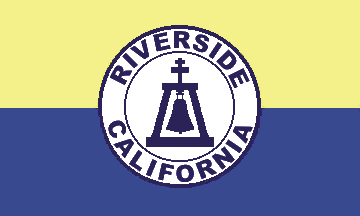
- June 7, 2016
- Turnout: 44.99%
Candidate	Rusty Bailey	Paul Davis
Party	Non-partisan	Non-partisan
Popular vote	33,033	7,994
Percentage	59.42%	14.38%
Candidate	Nancy Melendez
Party	Non-partisan
Popular vote	5,151
Percentage	9.27%
Mayor before election
Rusty Bailey
Elected mayor
Rusty Bailey

The 2016 Riverside, California mayoral election was held on June 7, 2016, to elect the mayor of Riverside, California. It saw the reelection of Rusty Bailey.

Because Bailey won a majority in the initial round of the election, no runoff was needed.

=== Results ===
2016 Riverside mayoral election results
Candidate	Votes	%
Rusty Bailey (incumbent)	33,033	59.42%
Paul Davis	7,994	14.38%
Nancy Melendez	5,151	9.27%
Vivian Moreno	2,719	4.89%
Patrick Benedict "Babatúndé" Small	2,262	4.07%
Sally Martinez	705	1.27%
Total votes	55,597	100%
Turnout		44.99%

== 2020 ==
Riverside, California mayoral election, 2020
- March 5, 2020 (first round); November 3, 2020 (runoff)
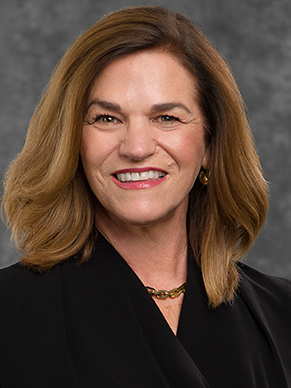

Candidate	Patricia Lock Dawson	Andy Melendrez
Party	Non-partisan	Non-partisan
First round	19,572 (35.76%)	23,788 (43.47%)
Second round	67,779 (58.78%)	47,529 (41.22%)
Candidate	Rich Gardner	Guy A. Harrell
Party	Non-partisan	Non-partisan
First round	6,530; 11.93%	2,910 (5.32%)
Second round	Eliminated	Eliminated
Mayor before election
Rusty Bailey
Elected mayor
Patricia Lock Dawson

The 2020 Riverside, California mayoral election was held on March 3, 2020, to elect the mayor of Riverside, California. It saw the election of Patricia Lock Dawson.

=== Results ===
First round

2020 Riverside mayoral election first round results
Candidate	Votes	%
Andy Melendrez	23,788	43.47
Patricia Lock Dawson	19,572	35.76
Rich Gardner	6,530	11.93
Guy A. Harrell	2,910	5.32
Phil Long Tran "JD" Denilofs	1,253	2.29
Acea D. Stapler	676	1.24
Total votes	54,729	100
Turnout		38.23%

Runoff

2020 Riverside mayoral election runoff results
Candidate	Votes	%
Patricia Lock Dawson	67,779	58.78
Andy Melendrez	47,529	41.22
Total votes	115,308	100

== 2024 ==
Riverside, California mayoral election, 2024
- March 5, 2024
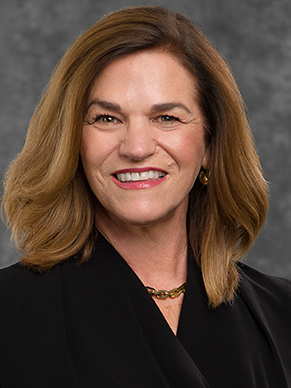

Candidate	Patricia Lock Dawson	Jessica Qattawi
Party	Non-partisan	Non-partisan
Popular vote	31,833	9,176
Percentage	77.6%	22.3%
Mayor before election
Patricia Lock Dawson
Elected mayor
Patricia Lock Dawson

The 2024 Riverside, California mayoral election was held on March 3, 2024, to elect the mayor of Riverside, California. Incumbent mayor Patricia Lock Dawson secured a second term as mayor.

This was the first mayoral election since the election of Ronald O. Loveridge's fifth term as mayor in the 2009 mayoral election to have only two candidates on the ballot.

It was also the first election since 2016 to not progress to a runoff.

=== Candidates ===
- Patricia Lock Dawson, incumbent mayor
- Jessica Qattawi, small business owner

=== Results ===
2024 Riverside mayoral election
Candidate	Votes	%
Patricia Lock Dawson (incumbent)	31,833	77.62
Jessica Qattawi	9,176	22.38
Total votes	41,009	100
