= Frank Rhodes =

Frank Rhodes may refer to:

- Frank Rhodes (British Army officer) (1851–1905)
- Frank H. T. Rhodes (1926–2020), president of Cornell University, 1977–1995

Similarly named:

- Franc Rhodes (1852–1924), secret society co-founder
