= List of mayors of Riverside, California =

Mayor of Riverside
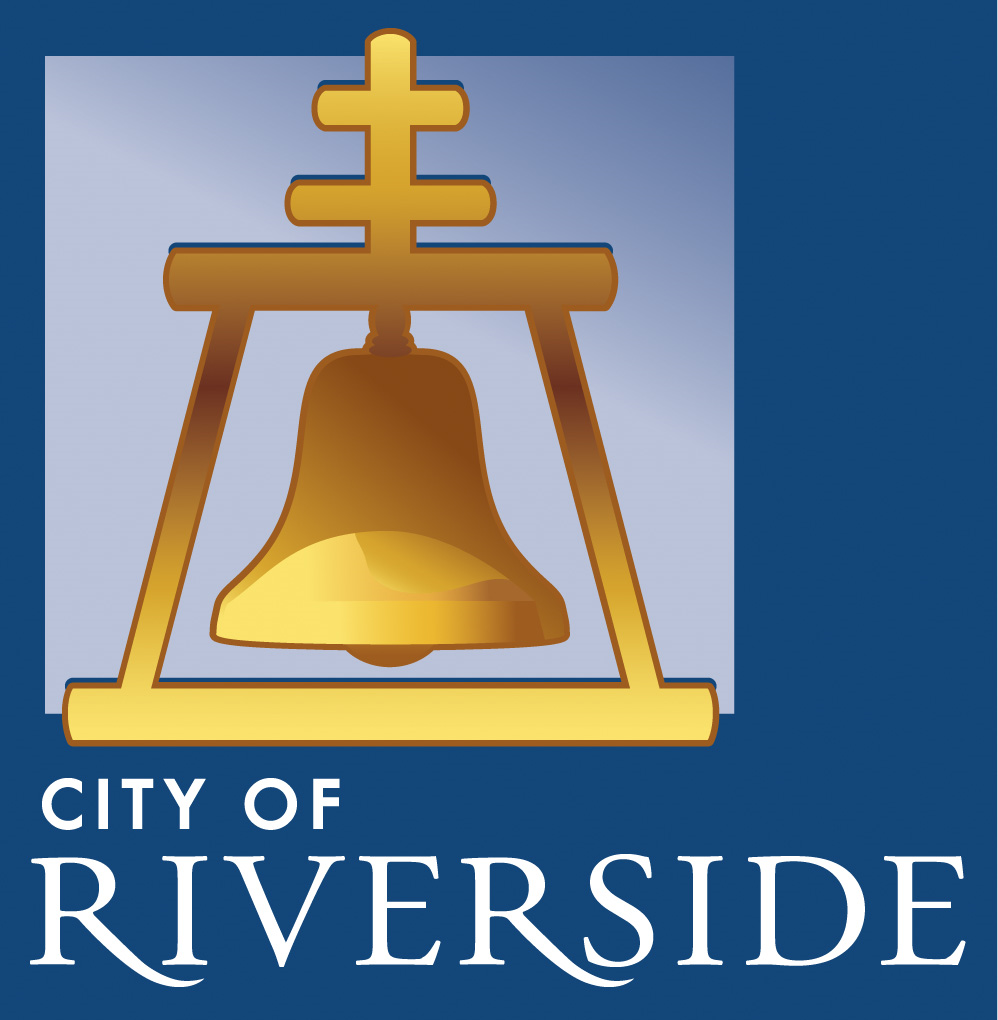
- Seal of Riverside

- Flag of Riverside

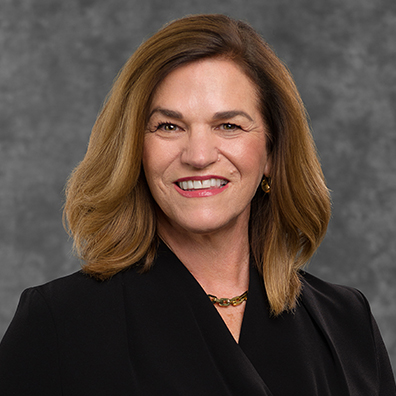
- Incumbent; Patricia Lock Dawson since December 8, 2020
- Term length: 4 years
- Formation: 1909
- First holder: Samuel Cary Evans Jr

The persons listed below have held the office of mayor of Riverside, California, United States, since March 1, 1907, when the city adopted its first charter.

From the time Riverside was incorporated on September 25, 1883, until the city adopted a charter, a board of trustees ran the city. Unofficially, the president of the board was at times referred to as the mayor.

== List of mayors ==
| No. | Mayor | Photo | Took office | Left office | Party | Background notes |
|---|---|---|---|---|---|---|
| 1 | Samuel Cary Evans Jr | | 1909 | 1912 | | Son of Samuel Cary Evans Sr, one of Riverside's founders. President of Riverside's Freeholders Charter Board before being elected the first mayor. Served as a State Legislator from the Thirty-ninth Senatorial District, representing Riverside and Imperial Counties, from 1916 to 1921. Riverside's Lake Evans, in Fairmount Park, and Evans Sports Complex are named in honor of the Evans family. The family donated land to the city for both projects. |
| 2 | William L. Peters | | 1912 | 1914 | | |
| 3 | Oscar Ford | | 1914 | 1917 | Republican | Son of Jimerson Ford, a farmer from (West) Virginia. Born in Winterset, Iowa, on September 17, 1856. Oscar moved to Riverside when he was 19 and worked briefly for the railroad as a carpenter and as a brickmaker for Sheldon Brick Company before working for P. S. Russell, nurseryman, in 1877. Over the course of three years he learned the nurseryman trade and, while employed by Mr Russel, he purchased his own orchard north of Riverside. He later began managing orchards and at all times had 10 to 150 acres in his charge for Eastern owners. He managed the Worthley & Strong Fruit Company and the Spurance Fruit Company, as well as serving as local manager for the Producers Fruit Company. He entered politics in 1900, serving on the city board of trustees. Mr Ford was a leading contractor for the building of roads constructing many of the important paved highways of this part of California. His son, Albert Ford, served as District Attorney of Riverside County and City Attorney for the city of Riverside. |
| 4 | Horace Porter | | 1918 | 1922 | | |
| 5 | Lyman Van Wickle Brown | | 1922 | | | Son of Judge E. G. Brown, one of Riverside's founders, Lyman became a successful and diversified businessman. In addition to expanding his family's citrus holdings, he operated a ferry between Newport, California and Catalina Island, and produced cotton in Arizona during World War I. He was killed in an automobile accident on the day he was inaugurated as mayor. |
| - | Samuel Cary Evans Jr | | 1922 | 1925 | | Originally elected the first mayor of Riverside in 1907. |
| 6 | John T. Jarvis | | 1926 | 1927 | Republican | Born in Ontario, Canada. His primary success in Riverside was in high-end real estate. He served as the Riverside County Assessor from 1895 to 1899, and was a Riverside City Councilman from 1915 to 1925. |
| 7 | Edward M. Dighton | | 1928 | 1929 | | Accountant, grocery store owner, and strong prohibitionist. Recalled after a dispute with the City Council regarding the council's refusal to pass additional prohibition ordinances, and Dighton's unproven accusation of fiscal irregularities. |
| 8 | Joseph Long | | 1929 | 1933 | | Veteran of World War I, past Commander of American Legion Post 79 and California State Commander 1937–38, Vice President of Security Title & Guarantee Co; also active in Exchange Club, Riverside Community Players, and Drum & Bugle Corps. B - May 17, 1892, D - July 31, 1966. His only son, Maj. Joseph S. Long Jr. (USAF), is MIA from the Korean War. |
| - | Samuel Cary Evans Jr | | - | - | | The first mayor of Riverside in 1907. Was elected to office again, but died of a blood clot the day before taking office. |
| 9 | Eugene B. Criddle | | 1933 | 1937 | | |
| 10 | William C. Evans | | 1937 | 1940 | | |
| 11 | Walter C. Davidson | | 1941 | 1949 | | |
| - | William C. Evans | | 1949 | 1952 | | |
| 12 | Edward V. Dales | | 1953 | 1965 | | Graduated from Santa Monica High School, operated a pest control business in Riverside, E. V. Dales & Sons, and served as Riverside City Council member from 1936 until he became mayor in January, 1953. |
| 13 | Ben H. Lewis | | 1965 | 1978 | | Elected to three terms. Initially a commercial artist, and student of the Otis Art Institute, Lewis contracted with Universal Studios and appeared in a number of films. In the 1940s, following in his father's footsteps, Lewis went into the land title business. The main hall at the Riverside Convention Center and a bridge on Mount Rubidoux are named in his honor. |
| 14 | Ab Brown | | 1978 | 1990 | | Elected to three terms including one runoff elections in 1978. The Ab Brown Sports Complex, a large soccer facility in Riverside, was named in his honor. Because of his contributions to sports in the Riverside area, as well as his efforts to develop the soccer facility, he was inducted into the Riverside Sport Hall of Fame in 2008. |
| 15 | Teresa R. Frizzel | | 1990 | 1994 | | Defeated Ab Brown in a special runoff election. |
| 16 | Ronald Loveridge | | 1994 | 2012 | Democratic | Longest serving mayor in Riverside history, a tenure lasting 18 years. |
| 17 | Rusty Bailey | | 2012 | 2020 | Independent | Elected following the retirement of long-time Mayor Ronald Loveridge. Served for two terms and announced he would not seek re-election to a third term in September 2019. |
| 18 | Patricia Lock Dawson | | 2020 | Current | Democratic | Elected following the retirement of Mayor Rusty Bailey from public office. Lock Dawson fell short of first place spot in the March 2020 Primary Election, but went on to have an overwhelming victory in the November 2020 General Election. She is currently seeking a second term as Mayor of Riverside in the 2024 Mayoral Election |

== See also ==
- Mayoral elections in Riverside, California
