= Edith Allen Phelps =

Oklahoma librarian (1866–1945)

Edith Allen Phelps (February 10, 1866 – July 2, 1945) was the first professional in the Library Science field in the Oklahoma City system. She served twice as president of the Oklahoma Library Association.

== Early life ==
Edith Allen Phelps was born in Springfield, Missouri, on February 10, 1866, the daughter of Col. John Elisha Phelps (1839-1921) and Margaret Jane White (1846-1915), a prominent family descended from Ethan Allen. She had two siblings: Lucy Phelps (1869-1895) and John Smith Phelps (1872-1947).

Phelps attended Drexel University and trained at Columbia University in Library Science.

== Career ==
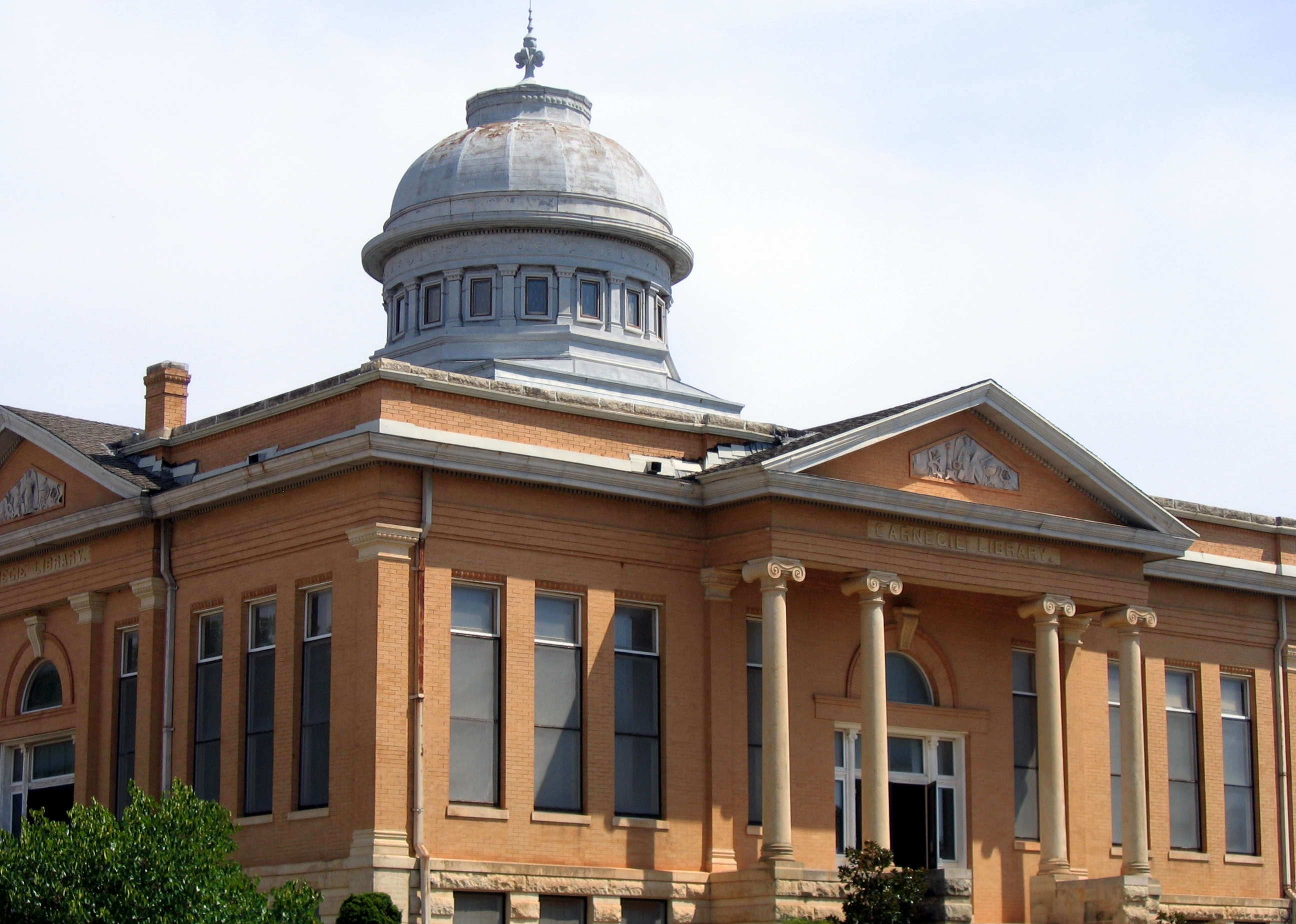
Carnegie Library (Guthrie, Oklahoma)

Phelps was the librarian at Paso Robles Public Library. For four years she was connected with the Library of the University of Missouri; for 12 years (from 1904 to 1916) she was the librarian at the Carnegie Library in Guthrie, Oklahoma and here taught Library Science course for the University of Oklahoma. For two years she was the librarian at Tyler, Texas, and in 1919 she was the Public Library Cataloguer in Kansas City Public Library.

Phelps was president of the Oklahoma Library Association from 1911 through 1913, serving two terms. In 1905 she started at Carnegie Library as Head Librarian, the first professional in the Library Science field in the Oklahoma City system. Among many innovations, she is recognized for having introduced the Dewey classification.

She was a charter member of the Special Libraries Association and a member of Paso Robles Woman's Club, American Library Association, California Library Association, Daughters of the American Revolution, P.E.O. Sisterhood, Colonial Dames of America.

== Personal life ==
In 1916 Edith Allen Phelps resigned from her position at the Oklahoma Library Association in protest at the library board and, after brief periods in Texas and Kansas libraries, accepted a position at the public library in San Luis Obispo, California. She lived at Paso Robles, California.

She died on July 2, 1945, and is buried at San Miguel District Cemetery, San Miguel, California.
