= Patricia Lock Dawson =

American politician

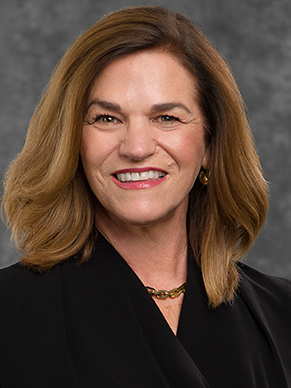
- Lock Dawson in 2021

18th Mayor of Riverside
- Incumbent
- Assumed office December 8, 2020
- Preceded by: Rusty Bailey

Personal details
- Born: Patricia Lock Dawson Riverside, California, U.S.
- Children: Three
- Education: University of California, Riverside (BS), University of Washington (MS)

Patricia Lock Dawson is an American politician who has been mayor of Riverside, California since 2020, when she was elected. Lock Dawson succeeded Rusty Bailey. She previously spent nine years on the Riverside Unified School District Board of Trustees.

In October 2025 Riverside Mayor Patricia Lock-Dawson was selected to lead the Big City Mayors, a statewide coalition made up of the mayors of California’s 13 largest cities. She earned her bachelor's degree in biology from the University of California, Riverside and her master's degree in wildlife ecology from the University of Washington.
