= Ona F. Meens =

American academic administrator

Ona Jane Foley Meens (March 27, 1886 - August 21, 1980) was head resident of California Hall and director of men's dining hall at the University of Redlands, California, United States.

== Early life ==
Ona Jane Foley was born in Somerset, Kentucky, on March 27, 1886, the daughter of Rev. William Harrison Foley (1850–1900) and Sarah Jane Fuqua (1852–1940).

She studied at William Jewell College and graduated from Liberty Ladies' College.

== Career ==
Meens was General Secretary of the Young Women's Christian Association.

She was Physical director of Girls at Bethel College, North Newton, Kansas; after that she was Physical director at Junior College, Grand Junction, Colorado. She was General Secretary of Girls' Work at Scotts Bluff County, Nebraska. She was Extension teacher in "Child Training" and "Home Hygiene" at University of Nebraska–Lincoln. For seven years she was director of summer camps for girls.

In 1934 she was appointed as head resident of California Hall and director of men's dining hall at the University of Redlands.

She is the author of "The Twelfth Christmas", "Armistice Day", "My Son", "Principles of Child Training", "Home Making", "Character Building", and also poems and articles.

She was a member of P.E.O. Sisterhood, Fortnightly Music Club, Monday Study Club, Business and Professional Women's Club.

== Personal life ==
Meens lived in Missouri and moved to Colorado in 1923. She lived at Tri-Mountain Ranch, Grand Junction, Colorado.

She married Albert Welcome Meens, a YMCA secretary for more than 15 years, and had two children: David F. and Ona Lou.

She died on August 21, 1980, in Riverside, California, and is buried at IOOF Cemetery, Grand Junction, together with her husband and son, David.
