= Laura Chenoweth Butz =

American educator (1860–1939)

- Born: July 11, 1860; Danville, Illinois, U.S.
- Died: September 1, 1939 (aged 79)
- Burial place: Forest Cemetery, Coeur d'Alene, Idaho, U.S.
- Occupation: Educator
- Spouse: Robert Allen Butz (m. 1879; died 1923)
- Children: 4

Laura Chenoweth Butz (July 11, 1860 – September 1, 1939) was an American educator. After moving from the Midwest to Shoshone County, Idaho, in 1899, she became involved in local schools in a region dominated by silver mining. She served as the Superintendent of Wardner-Kellogg City Schools in Idaho for eight years, 1915-1923. She also served as assistant to the Idaho State Superintendent Research Secretary in the Department of Education in Boise, Idaho.

== Early life and marriage ==
Laura Ann Chenoweth was born in Danville, Illinois, on July 11, 1860, the daughter of Thomas N. Chenoweth (died 1903) and his wife.

In 1879, at the age of 19, she married Robert Allen Butz (1851–1923). They had four children together: sons C. W. Butz, J. C. Butz, Harry L. Butz, and a daughter, who later married D. M. Rees. The Butz family lived in Kansas for nearly 20 years.

== Career ==
In 1899 Laura Chenoweth Butz moved with her family to Idaho. They first settled in Shoshone County. Beginning in 1900, Butz began to serve in the Wardner-Kellogg schools. This continued until 1923, including the eight years she served as Superintendent of Wardner-Kellogg City Schools.

Butz also served as assistant to the State Superintendent Research Secretary of the Department of Education in the capital, Boise, Idaho.

Active in educational work of the state, she became well-known as a lecturer with the Parent–Teacher Association.

== Personal life ==
In 1899 the Butz family moved from Kansas to Idaho. According to the 1900 United States census, she and her family lived at Wardner 1-2, Osburn, Shoshone, Idaho. This area, including the city of Kellogg, was dominated by the silver mining industry. Her husband died by 1928.

Butz was long a member of the Women's Federated Club and P.E.O. Sisterhood, which was founded in Iowa. She died on September 1, 1939. She is buried at Forest Cemetery, Coeur d'Alene, Idaho.
