= Evergreen Cemetery (Riverside, California) =

Evergreen Memorial Park and Evergreen Memorial Historic Cemetery
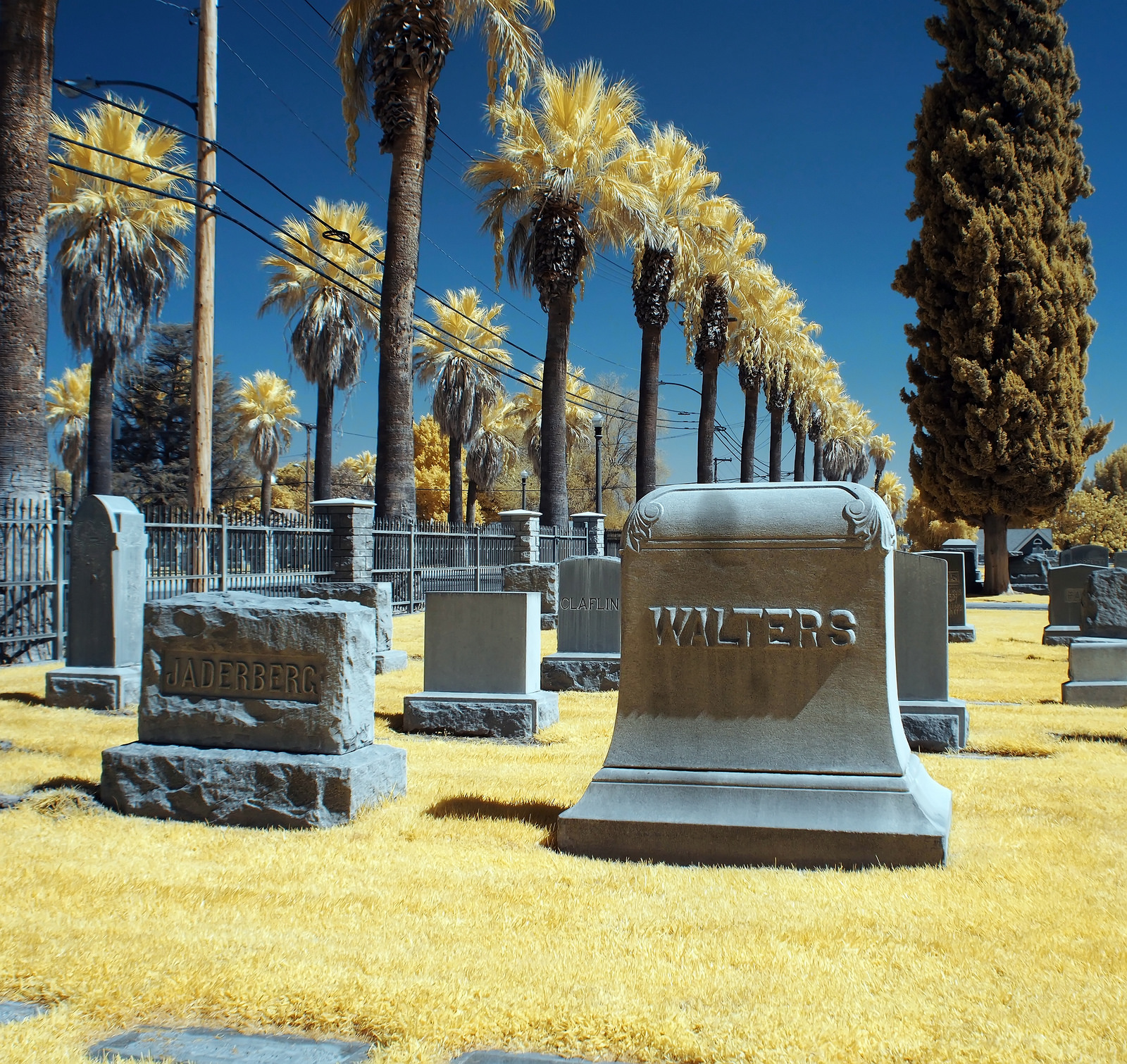
- Evergreen Cemetery
- Interactive map of Evergreen Memorial Park and Evergreen Memorial Historic Cemetery

Details
- Established: 1872
- Location: Riverside, California
- Country: United States
- Coordinates: 33.9799°N 117.3869°W
- Type: Public
- No. of graves: ≈ 27,000
- Website: Evergreen Cemetery; Evergreen Cemetery Grave Locator
- Find a Grave: Evergreen Memorial Park and Evergreen Memorial Historic Cemetery
- The Political Graveyard: Evergreen Memorial Park and Evergreen Memorial Historic Cemetery

Evergreen Cemetery and Riverside Mausoleum
- Interactive map of Evergreen Cemetery and Riverside Mausoleum

Riverside Landmark
- Official name: Evergreen Cemetery and Riverside Mausoleum
- Reference no.: 67

Evergreen Cemetery, or Evergreen Memorial Park is a cemetery in Riverside, California, United States. The first burial occurred in 1872, and the cemetery became the resting place of many historic figures of Riverside.

== History ==
A portion of the current cemetery was originally set aside in 1870 when Riverside was platted. When the Riverside Cemetery Association was formed on November 11, 1873, they named the cemetery the Riverside Cemetery.

In 1880 the Riverside Cemetery Association incorporated as the Evergreen Cemetery Association. In 1966 the name Evergreen Memorial Park and Mausoleum was adopted, and burials continue today in the newer sections of the cemetery under that name.

The older sections of the cemetery, now named the Evergreen Historic Memorial Cemetery, were in disrepair for many years, but were restored in 2008 through a cooperative effort by concerned citizens and the city.

== Notable interments ==
- Hershel L. Carnahan (1879–1941), 30th Lieutenant Governor of California (1928–1931)
- Marcella Craft (1874–1959), Riverside resident who became an international opera star.
- Stephen W. Cunningham (1886–1956), first UCLA graduate manager and Los Angeles City Council member, 1933–41
- Milton J. Daniels (1838–1940), a United States House of Representatives member from California.
- Isabel H. Ellis (1881–1962), president of the Riverside Woman's Club
- Edmund C. Hinde (1830–1909), was a gold miner during the California Gold Rush, and diarist whose journals are held by the state of California.
- Harry Hinde (1865–1942), politician, inventor, and businessman.
- Willits J. Hole (1858–1936), an American businessman and Southern California real estate developer. Known as the "father" of La Habra. (Buried with wife Mary B. Weeks-Hole (1865–1938).)
- John T. Jarvis (1847–1932), elected Mayor of Riverside in 1926.
- Frank Augustus Miller (1857–1935), founder of the Mission Inn in Riverside, California.
- John W. North (1815–1890), a 19th-century pioneer, American statesman, and founder of Riverside, California.
- Cornelius C. Smith (1869–1936), Indian Wars Medal of Honor recipient.
- Eliza Tibbets (1823–1898), planted the first navel orange in California, spawning the citrus industry in California.
- Luther C. Tibbets (1820–1902), along with his wife, helped spawn the citrus industry in California.
- Al Wilson (1939–2008), soul singer.
- Henry Westbrook (1847–1922) Contractor, Builder, Banker, Fruit Company Executive & Director of the Riverside Water Company.

== See also ==
- List of cemeteries in California
- List of cemeteries in Riverside County, California
