= Frank Augustus Miller =

American hotelier

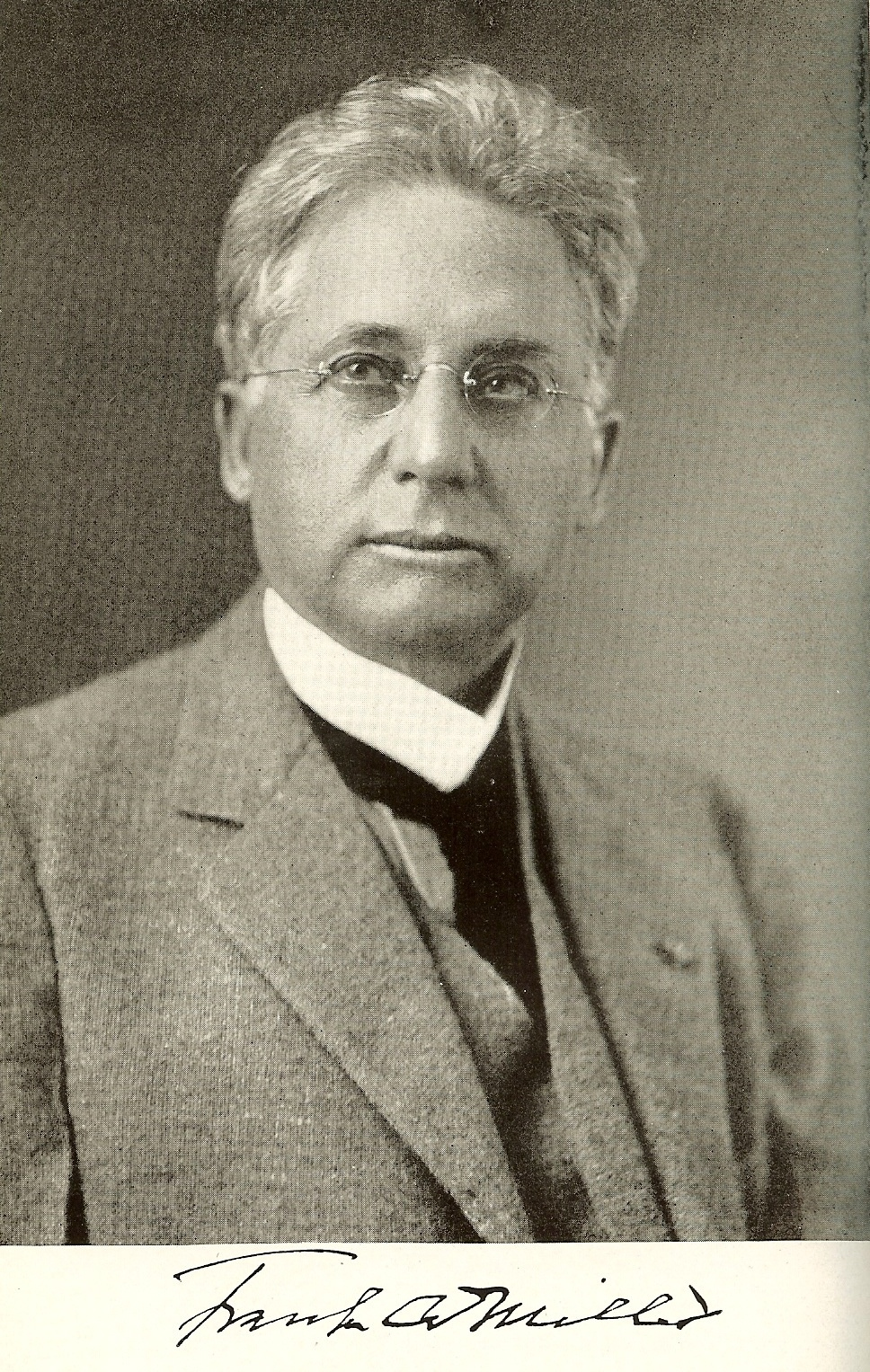
- Born: June 30, 1858; Tomah, Wisconsin
- Died: June 17, 1935 (aged 76); Riverside, California
- Resting place: Evergreen Cemetery (Riverside, California); 33.97967°N 117.38535°W
- Other name: "Master of the Inn"
- Occupation: Inn keeper
- Known for: Civic leader and builder of the Mission Inn.

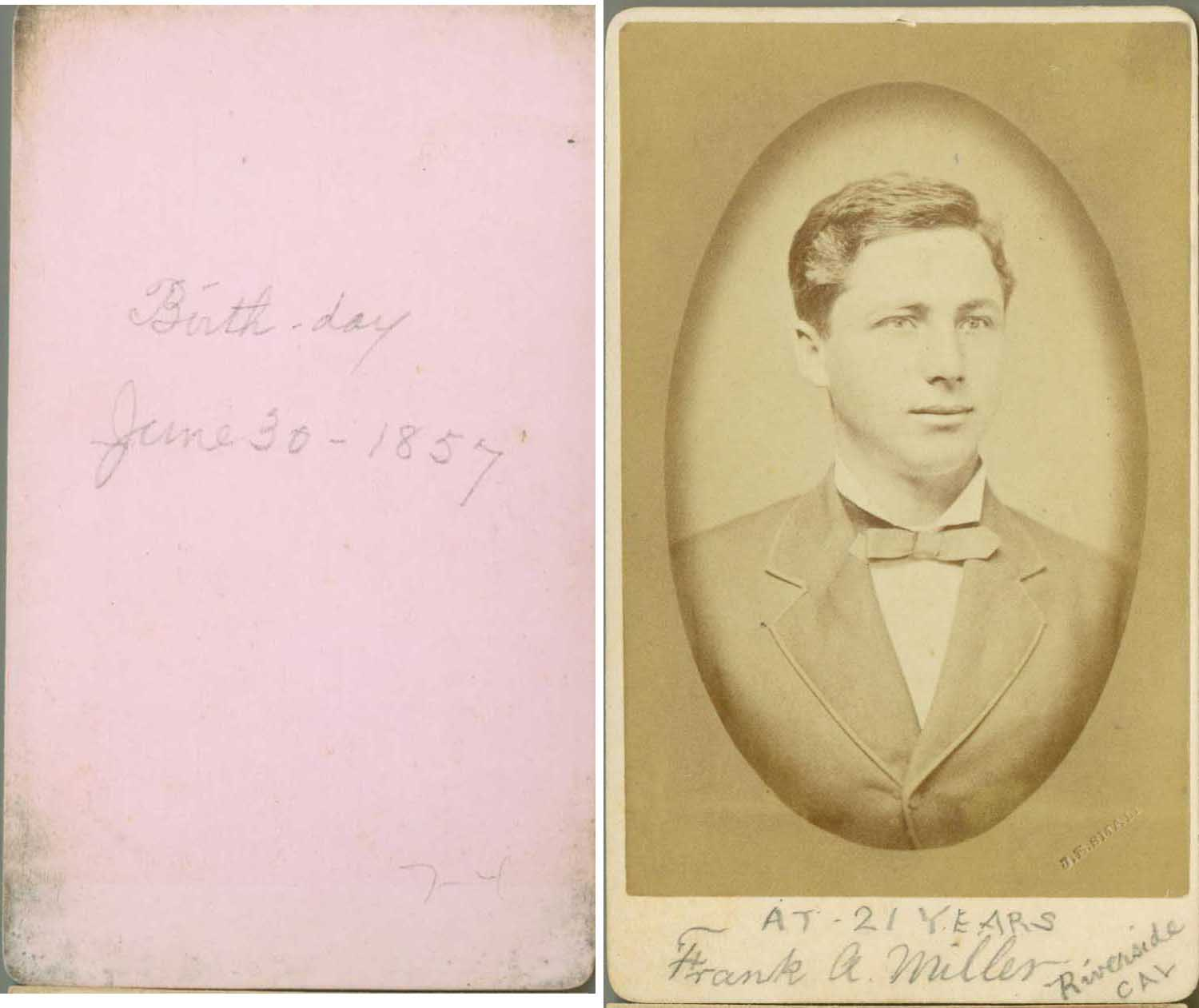
Frank Miller at age 21 years

Frank Augustus Miller (June 30, 1858 – June 17, 1935) was the owner and chief developer of the Mission Inn in Riverside, California, United States, where Frank Augustus Miller Middle School was named after him. He was also a civic leader and one of Riverside's strongest promoters.

Frank Miller was born in Tomah, Wisconsin in 1857 to Christopher Columbus "CC" Miller and Maryanne Miller, one of four children. CC Miller brought his family to Riverside in 1874. As a surveyor and civil engineer CC was a respected and valuable contributor to the development of Riverside. He paid $250 cash for a one square block parcel of downtown Riverside. He and his family built a home of which the first floor was adobe bricks and the second floor was wood-frame construction. They did not like the appearance of the adobe building and drew upon their Midwest values to cover it in wooden clapboards. The 12 room structure had originally been planned as a home for the Miller family with extra rooms for boarders, since there were no hostelries available for visitors.

Both of Frank Miller's parents had college degrees and they wanted to send him to a college in Ohio. He pleaded with them stating that he really wasn't a good student anyway and he would live an exemplary life if they would let him stay in Riverside and run the hotel. His parents assented and Maryanne made arrangements for the only teacher in town, Isabella Hardenberg, to tutor her son, Frank. Isabella was already a boarder at the Glenwood Inn. After months of tutoring, Frank and Isabella hit it off and married in 1880. Since CC did not like managing the boarding house, he later sold it and the property to Frank for $5K.

In 1902 Frank Miller and his architect Arthur Benton built "the Mission Wing", a U-shaped structure in 'Mission Revival' style of 84 new rooms as the first major expansion to the Mission Inn. He garnered $250,000 in financial support from his friend, Henry Huntington. In 1911 the Cloister Wing was built by architect Arthur Benton. In 1914 the Spanish Wing was completed (of which the first three floors were designed by architect Myron Hunt, who also designed the Rose Bowl, Huntington Library and the First Congregational Church in Riverside). In 1931 the Rotunda Wing by architect G. Stanley Wilson was completed.

Some of Frank Miller's accomplishments include:

- started a trolley service from the Mission Inn Hotel to Arlington along Magnolia Blvd
- opened the "Blue Front Grocery" named for the bright blue paint on the front of the store
- managed the 1,000 seat Loring Opera House including arranging for the entertainers
- was influential in relocating a Native American Indian School from Perris to Riverside named the "Sherman School" after James S. Sherman, the Congressman who helped obtain the funding in 1900
- started the Mount Rubidoux Easter Sunrise Service in 1909 which still occurs every Easter
- was a founding member of the County of Riverside when it formed from portions of San Diego and San Bernardino Counties
- helped arrange for the Federal Government to locate a military airfield, March Field, adjacent to Riverside now known as March Field Air Reserve Base
- was influential in arranging for a Citrus Testing Station to help citrus growers optimize procedures and defend their crops from diseases. The Citrus Testing Station ultimately became the University of California, Riverside, aka UCR, which had 22,000 students in 2016

He is buried in Riverside's Evergreen Cemetery.

== Bibliography ==
- Brown Jr, John and James Boyd. History of San Bernardino and Riverside Counties; With Selected Biography of Actors and Witnesses of the Period of Growth and Achievement, 3 volumes, The Western Historical Association, 1922. Lewis Publishing, Chicago. OCLC 8019575
- Gale, Zona. Frank Miller of the Mission Inn, New York, D. Appleton-Century Company, 1938. OCLC 2181944
- Gunther, Jane Davies. Riverside County, California, Place Names; Their Origins and Their Stories, Riverside, CA, Rubidoux Printing, 1984. LCCN 84-72920. OCLC 12103181
- Hodgen, Maurice. Master of the Mission Inn: Frank Miller, a Life. North Charleston, SC, Ashburton Publishing, c2013. ISBN 9780976278511 OCLC 876931972
- Patterson, Tom. A Colony for California. Riverside Museum Associates, 1996. ISBN 9780935661248. OCLC 35812626
- Patterson, Tom. Landmarks of Riverside, and the Stories Behind Them. Press-Enterprise Co., Riverside, CA, 1964. OCLC 3512580
- Wenzel, Glenn. "Anecdotes on Frank Miller and the Mount Rubidoux Easter pilgrimages", Journal of the Riverside Historical Society, Riverside, CA, No. 13, February 2009.
- Wenzel, Glenn and Wenzel, Seth (illust.) Anecdotes on Mount Rubidoux and Frank A. Miller, her promoter. Riverside, CA, 2010 ISBN 9781450705028. OCLC 604994425
