= John T. Jarvis =

American mayor (1847–1932)

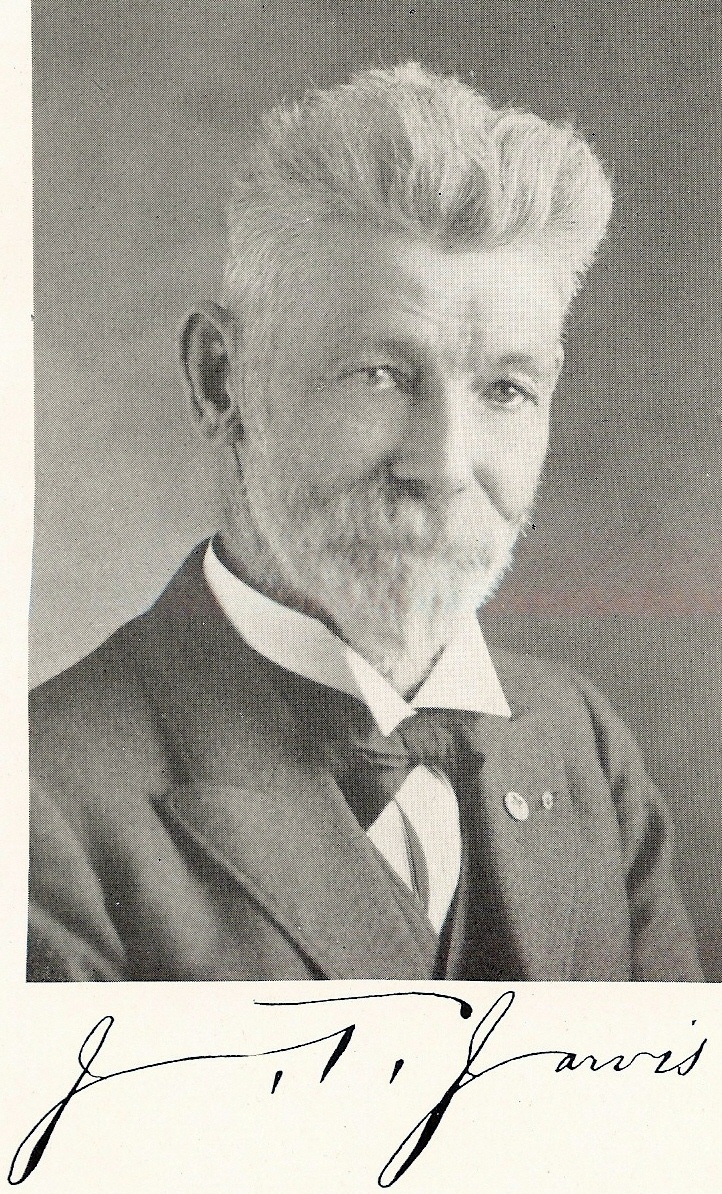

5th Mayor of Riverside
- In office January 1, 1926 – December 31, 1927
- Preceded by: Samuel Cary Evans Jr
- Succeeded by: Edward Dighton

Personal details
- Born: March 10, 1847 North Oxford, Ontario. Canada
- Died: January 3, 1932 (aged 84)
- Party: Republican
- Spouse: Matilda A. Dundas
- Children: 8
- Education: Jones' Commercial College of London, Ontario, Canada
- Profession: Businessman and Real estate broker

John T. Jarvis (March 10, 1847 – January 3, 1932) was the sixth mayor of Riverside, California, United States. Prior to the office of mayor, Jarvis was the Riverside County Assessor, and a Riverside city councilman. A successful businessman, he helped establish many of Riverside's early business enterprises, particularly those in fruit-growing, fruit-packing, and real estate.

== Personal life ==
Jarvis was born in North Oxford, Ontario, Canada in 1847 to Jonathan and Eliza (Allan) Jarvis. At the age of 13, he left school and began work as an errand boy for a grocery store, and quickly worked his way up to manager. In 1869, he left the store and joined his father in the dairy and cheese-making business. He married Matilda A. Dundas that same year.

John and Matilda moved to Riverside, California in 1881. Once there, he joined his brother, Dr. Joseph Jarvis, in a fruit drying business. He became a partner in the fruit-packing firm of Griffin & Skelley, serving as the buyer for the firm. Jarvis quickly became a prominent figure in the fruit growing and packing industry in and around Riverside. He managed many of his own orchards, operated a citrus nursery, and bought and shipped honey.

Jarvis was also involved in a number of other early Riverside business ventures. He organized the Royal Steam Laundry and served as president for 10 years, he helped organize the Citizens Bank, and he ran a dry goods store named J. T. Jarvis & Company, which later became Rouse's Department Store after he sold his interest to Gaylor Rouse. The Rouse's Department Store Building is now Riverside City Landmark Number 50.

In 1887, changing careers again, Jarvis went into real estate. In 1892 he founded J. T. Jarvis and B. B. Bush, which became a prominent real estate firm. In 1895, he initiated the People's Abstract Company, served for 12 years as president, and later sold the company to the Riverside Title Company.

The Jarvis house in downtown Riverside, on Twelfth Street, was originally built in 1887 in the Victorian gothic style, but Jarvis and his wife had the house remodeled in 1914 to reflect the more fashionable bungalow style. The Jarvis House has been designated Riverside City Landmark Number 78.

On January 3, 1932, John T. Jarvis died of a stroke and was buried at Riverside's Evergreen Cemetery. His wife had died a year earlier.

== Political career ==
Office held	Took office	Left office
Riverside County Assessor	January 5, 1895	January 2, 1899
Riverside City Councilman	November 22, 1915	December 29, 1925
Mayor of Riverside	January 1, 1926	December 31, 1927

== See also ==
- List of mayors of Riverside, California
