= Saidie Orr Dunbar =

American nurse

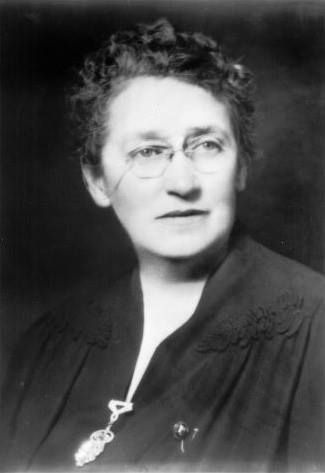
Saidie Orr Dunbar

Saidie Orr Dunbar (June 23, 1880 – May 13, 1960) was a leading figure in the improvement of public health in Oregon in the early twentieth century. She was very active in social service work and is considered the "founder of public nursing in Oregon".

== Early life ==
Saidie Orr was born in Granger, Missouri, on June 23, 1880, the daughter of Robert Perry Orr and Catherine Lindsay.

== Career ==
Saidie Orr Dunbar started her career with the Oregon Tuberculosis Association when she took over the position as executive secretary in 1913. She came back to this position later in her life and continued to tour Oregon regularly, promoted the setting up of county health departments, and setting up local groups to aid in the fight against tuberculosis before retiring in 1951.

She was very actively involved in social service work; she served two terms as secretary of the National Conference of the Tuberculosis Secretaries; she was vice-president of the Portland Americanization Council; she was vice-president of the Council of Social Agencies.

From 1923 to 1926 she was the head of the Federation of Women's Clubs in Oregon, and was a member of the national federation. She eventually became the president of the national federation in 1938 and maintained that position until 1941. She instituted a two-year course of study on Latin America that culminated with a Good Neighbor Tour to South America in 1940. With the support of the Oregon federation, the state legislature of Oregon passed a law in 1941 that provides measures such as blood testing to help to control or prevent syphilis from women expecting children.

She was involved in the American way movements, which became popular during World War II. She believed that members of women's clubs "should make some contribution toward the safety, the permanence and the enrichment of our American way of life, which will carry us through the dark days ahead and add to the solidarity of our national life".

She was a member of the Daughters of the American Revolution, the Parent-Teacher Association, the P.E.O. Sisterhood, the Portland Woman's Club, and the Tuesday Afternoon Club.

== Personal life ==
Dunbar moved to Oregon in 1889 and settled in Portland, Oregon. She married Jesse Austin Dunbar and had two children: Kathryn and Allen.

She died on May 13, 1960, in Portland, Oregon.

== Legacy ==
In 1956, a scholarship was created by associations affiliated with Dunbar, and the scholarship was named after her. The scholarship is awarded to students in Oregon that are enrolled in medicine or nursing studies, and it is granted based on the promise that the students will work in Oregon after their graduation.

The Saidie Orr Dunbar diaries, 1923–1958, are preserved in the Special Collections and University Archives of the University of Oregon.
