= Ben H. Lewis =

American politician, artist, and businessman

13th Mayor of Riverside
- In office January 1, 1965 – December 31, 1978
- Preceded by: Edward V. Dales
- Succeeded by: Ab Brown

Personal details
- Born: November 27, 1902 Riverside, California, U.S.
- Died: June 20, 1985 (aged 82) Riverside, California, U.S.
- Spouse: Catherine Wasilchen
- Children: 2
- Education: Otis College of Art and Design

Ben H. Lewis (November 27, 1902 – June 20, 1985) was an American politician, artist, and businessman who served as the 13th mayor of Riverside, California. Prior to the office of mayor, Lewis was the president of the United Title Guaranty Company, later known as the Land Title Company, of Riverside. The main hall at the Riverside Convention Center is named in his honor, as well as a bridge on Mount Rubidoux.

== Early life ==
Lewis was the son of D. W. Lewis and Edith Binks. His father organized several land title insurance companies in Riverside, Orange, and Imperial Counties. Later, Lewis became the president and owner of the Riverside-based Land Title Company.

== Career ==
After attending high school in Riverside, Lewis attended the Otis College of Art and Design in Los Angeles. He subsequently became a commercial artist, made animated cartoons, and contracted with Universal Studios, where he appeared in several films. Upon returning to Riverside, Lewis began his career in the land title industry. He was also active in many community and fraternal organizations, as well as president of the Riverside Community Players, a local theatrical group.

== See also ==
- List of mayors of Riverside, California
