= Rachel Irene Seibert =

American lubwoman (1876–1967)

Rachel Irene Benshoof Seibert, Ph.G., (September 3, 1876 – November 29, 1967) was a clubwoman.

== Early life ==
Rachel Irene Benshoof was born in Blue Grass, Iowa, on September 3, 1876, the daughter of Jacob "Jake" A. Benshoof (1831–1926) and Mary Ann Dougherty (1839–1890).

Seibert was a teacher and took up the study of pharmacy and was a Graduate in Pharmacy at the University of Washington.

== Career ==
Seibert was active in social, church, civic and club affairs.

She served on several of the organizations of which she was a member, as president and secretary. She was State Treasurer of the Chehalis Business and Professional Women's Club.

She founded the Seibert Sunday School Map plan.

She was a member of P.E.O. Sisterhood, Delphine Society, Seattle Browning Society, Woman's Century, Music and Art Foundation, Classic Culture, Sororia Women's City Club.

== Personal life ==
Rachel Seibert moved to Washington in 1918. She lived at 305 Bellevue, N., Seattle, Washington.

She married David Allen Seibert (September 13, 1881 – August 7, 1956).

She died on November 29, 1967, in California.
