= Alice Bird Babb =

American educator (1850–1926)

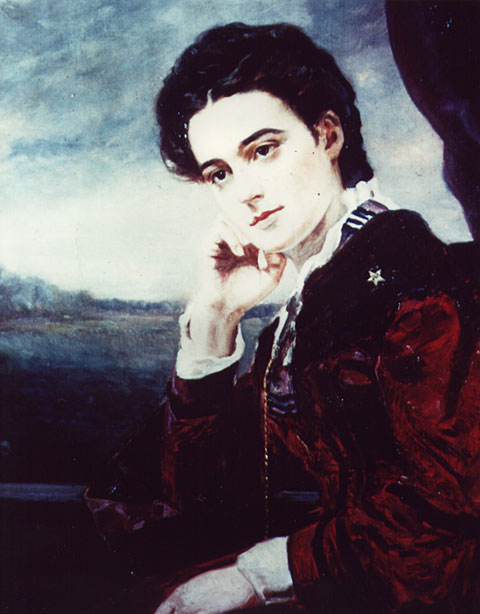
- portrait by Marion Dunlap Harper
- Born: May 8, 1850; Mount Pleasant, Iowa, US
- Died: November 21, 1926 (aged 76); Aurora, Illinois, US
- Occupation(s): Professor and co-founder of the P.E.O. Sisterhood

Alice Bird Babb (May 8, 1850 – November 21, 1926) was a professor and one of the founders of the P.E.O. Sisterhood. She worked with the sisterhood for 36 years. In 2022, a Wyoming chapter held a play in which members portrayed her and the six other founders.

== Personal life ==
Babb was born on May 8, 1850, in Mount Pleasant, Iowa, to Wellington Bird and Sarah Thornton. Her father was a physician in southeastern Iowa from 1849 until he died in 1897. Babb was educated in public schools, Howe's Academy, and then Iowa Wesleyan University, where she graduated from as an honor student in 1869. She married Washington Irving Babb in 1873 and they had four children. She moved to Aurora, Illinois, in 1906. Babb died on November 21, 1926, in Aurora.

== Career ==
On January 21, 1869, Babb and six other female students at Iowa Wesleyan University founded the P.E.O. Sisterhood. Babb wrote its constitution as well as its oath, was the first of them to take the oath, and was the first president of the first chapter. Babbs said that she wrote the oath in the "Holy of Holies", in reference to a spare bedroom. She served for three years as president. Shortly after graduating from the university, Babb started working as a high school principal. She became a professor of Greek and Latin at Iowa Wesleyan University. Babb was known as a lecturer who used "wit" and "scholarly presentation". As the P.E.O Sisterhood grew, she became chairman of a committee that made laws for the sisterhood. While living in Iowa for 36 years, Babb worked in the P.E.O. Sisterhood Chapter A and she was awarded with a diamond-studded star. For 20 years, Babb was in charge of annual senior class plays at Iowa Wesleyan University until she moved to Aurora. Babb said, "I earnestly hope the true spirit of P.E.O. will not be smothered in form, but that the original idea of kindliness, helpfulness, and charity will forever exist, and thus we will become a potent factor in the world’s welfare."

== Recognition ==
In 2013, pianist and P.E.O Sisterhood member Jill Kremer composed a CD of seven songs that matched the personalities of the seven founders. On August 27, 2022, P.E.O. Sisterhood members in Wyoming acted out the founders of the sisterhood with members portraying the seven founders.
