= Ronald O. Loveridge =

Former mayor of Riverside, California

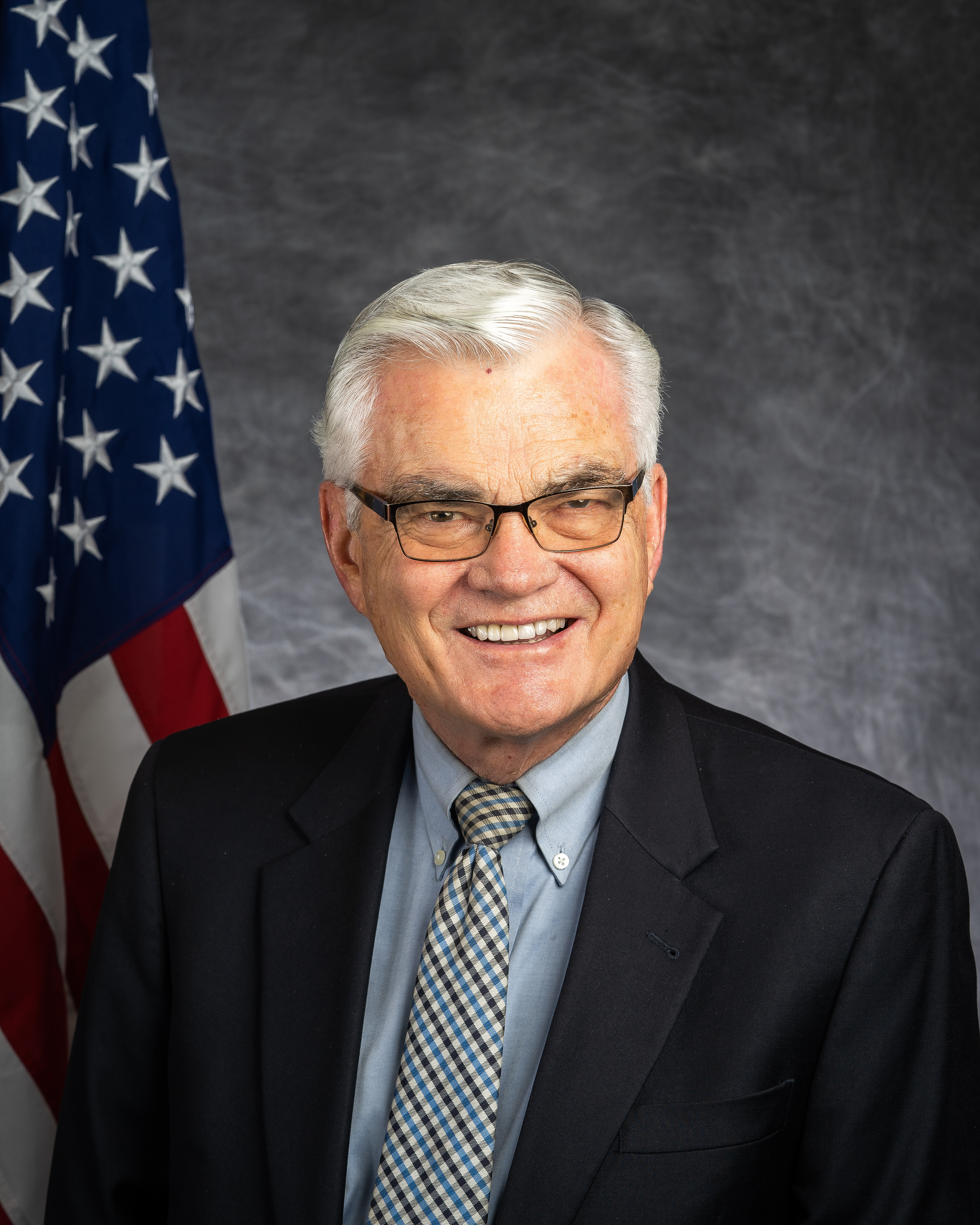

16th Mayor of Riverside
- In office January 1993 – November 2012
- Preceded by: Terresa R. Frizzel
- Succeeded by: Rusty Bailey

84th President of the National League of Cities
- In office 2010
- Preceded by: Kathleen Novak
- Succeeded by: James Mitchell Jr.

Personal details
- Born: 1937 or 1938 (age 87–88) Antioch, California, U.S.
- Party: Democratic
- Spouse: Marsha
- Children: 2
- Education: Stanford University
- Profession: Politician

Ronald O. Loveridge (born 1937/1938 in Antioch, California) is the former mayor of Riverside, California, United States. He resides in Riverside with his wife Marsha and has two adult children. He received his undergraduate degree from the University of the Pacific and his doctorate from Stanford and currently is an associate professor of Political Science at the University of California, Riverside. His research focuses on urban politics and public policy, particularly environmental policy.

== Political career ==
He was elected to the Riverside City council in 1979, and served in that role until 1993. He was elected as the Mayor of Riverside in 1993, and was re-elected in 1997, 2001, 2005, and 2009. After a 30 year career in elected public service, Mayor Loveridge decided not to run for a 6th term and stepped down in 2012. He was succeeded by William "Rusty" Bailey.

Loveridge served as president of the National League of Cities in 2010. Also in 2010, Loveridge was elected as a fellow of the National Academy of Public Administration.

Loveridge has presented his stance on environmental issues in a public document titled "The Mayor’s Call to Action for a Sustainable Riverside."

== Academic career ==
Loveridge earn his Political Science Ph.D. from Stanford University. He then began a career as a college professor at the University of California, Riverside in 1965. Nearly 60 years later, he has become the longest-serving professor. After leaving public office, he took a position as the director of UCR’s Inland Center for Sustainable Development, a research hub operated by the School of Public Policy.

== See also ==
- List of mayors of Riverside, California
