= Isabel H. Ellis =

American clubwomen (1881–1962)

Isabel "Bell" Harris Ellis (February 28, 1881 – November 25, 1962) was the president of the Riverside Woman's Club.

== Early life ==
Isabel "Bell" Harris Ellis was born in Crawford County, Wisconsin, on February 28, 1881, the daughter of James Harris (1848–1908) and Olive Lucretia Taft (1854–1952).

== Career ==
She was active in civic and club work. She was the president of the Woman's Club of Perris, California. She served 3 terms as president of the Riverside Woman's Club. She was chairman of the Art Exhibition at the Southern California Fair at Riverside.

She was a member of the Rubidoux Chapter of the Daughters of the American Revolution and of the P.E.O. Sisterhood.

Ellis was the secretary of one of the District Court of Appeals judges and was a well-known speaker, having talked for numerous clubs and organizations. Ellis was interested in local history, Spanish California, and the American political scene. For many years she was a book reviewer of contemporary fiction and biography.

== Personal life ==
Isabel H. Ellis moved to California in 1911 and lived at 1163 Cedar Street, Riverside, California. She married William Henry Ellis (1862–1928).

She died on November 25, 1962, and is buried at Evergreen Cemetery (Riverside, California).

== Legacy ==
In 1963 her library of 1,878 volumes of books and 9 scrapbooks on Riverside and Spanish California were donated to the University of California, Riverside.
