= Franc Roads =

American artist

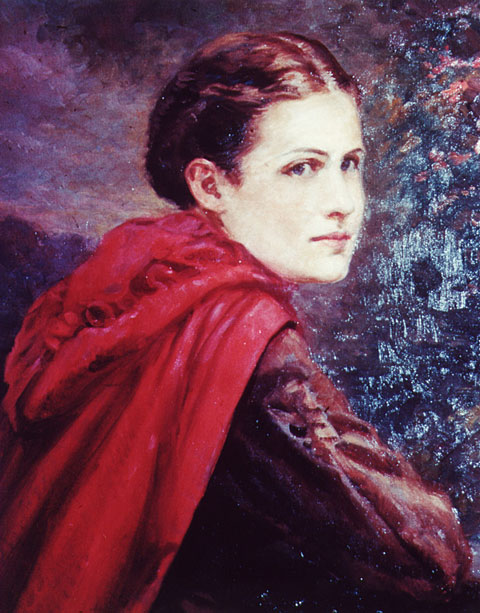
- Franc Roads portrait by Marion Harper
- Born: February 10, 1852; Mount Pleasant, Iowa
- Died: August 9, 1924 (aged 72); Chicago, Illinois

Frances Elizabeth Roads Elliott (1852–1924), nicknamed Franc, was an American artist, art educator, feminist, and a co-founder of the P.E.O. Sisterhood.

== Biography ==
Franc Roads was born in Mount Pleasant, Iowa in 1852. She sometimes spelled her name Rhodes. She attended Iowa Wesleyan College, one of very few colleges in the 1860s accepting both women and men as students.

=== Founding P.E.O. ===
In 1869, Roads and a college friend, Hattie Briggs, sat upon the fence surrounding the Wesleyan campus and discussed the recent formation of I.C. Sorosis, a secret society for women today called Pi Beta Phi and regarded as the first college sorority. Roads and Briggs conceived of forming their own secret society. They invited other college friends as cofounders, and chose the name P.E.O. for their secret society. There were very few social organizations for women at that time, and the new society grew rapidly. P.E.O. Sisterhood is now an international philanthropic organization.

=== Founding UNL art program ===
In 1872 she married Simon Charles Elliott. The couple moved to Lincoln, Nebraska and operated a ceramics business. Roads operated the only kiln for chinaware in the city and learned the art of painting and glazing ceramics.

Roads became the first art teacher at the University of Nebraska in 1874 establishing the institution's art department. Her children also attended the university. There was a friendship between Roads' family and the family of James Hulme Canfield, the University of Nebraska president. Roads' daughter Stella married the president's son, James Canfield, the brother of Dorothy Canfield Fisher.

Roads was appointed the commissioner representing artwork of Nebraska at the 1884 World's Fair. She was a leader in the Nebraska YWCA.

=== Later life ===
Roads and her husband moved to Chicago in 1911. He died in 1915. Roads pursued graduate study at the University of Chicago and at UC Berkeley. She worked as an artist and ceramicist.

She kept in touch with the P.E.O Sisterhood as it grew, and was often invited to speak to its local groups. She was particularly interested in the Sisterhood's educational reform projects. Roads designed a model school room in Aurora, Illinois and art curriculum for children.

Roads advocated for women to be included in the leadership of the Methodist Episcopal Church, for the enfranchisement of women, and for the abolition of war. She died in 1924 in Chicago. She is buried in Mount Pleasant.

== Legacy ==
Although originally patterned on a college sorority, the secret society that Roads co-founded took the form of a civic organization for adult women, rather than an on-campus organization. The P.E.O. Sisterhood now includes hundreds of thousands of women. It operates Cottey College, a private women's college in Missouri.

Roads' quotation "We P.E.O. women would join hands in any movement looking toward the abolishment of war" is used as the slogan of a Sisterhood-funded scholarship intended to promote international peace through access to education for girls. Sisterhood members celebrate Founders' Day on January 21 to honor Roads and her co-founders.

Art classes that Roads began in Lincoln are an ancestor of today's Hixson–Lied College of Fine and Performing Arts.
