= Iris Pavey Gilmore =

American writer (1900–1982)

Iris Pavey Gilmore (1900-1982) was an American writer. She wrote both non-fiction for adults and juveniles. She had a particular interest in Colorado history.

== Early life ==
Iris Pavey Gilmore was born in Villa Ridge, Illinois, in 1900, the daughter of C. W. B. Pavey. She was educated at Schuster-Martin Dramatic School, in Cincinnati, Ohio, founded by an aunt of the actor Tyrone Power. She received a B.A. in education and drama in 1921 and an M.A. in 1944 from the University of Denver.

== Career ==
Gilmore was a dramatic teacher and director. During the 1920s and 1930s, she worked as the dramatic director of the KOA Radio Station in Denver. Gilmore also taught music at the Lamont School of Music. Other projects included working with children’s theater and dance in Denver and teaching speech and English at the University of Denver.

She was a member of the National Altrusa Club, the Sigma Alpha Lata (the National Music Fraternity), P.E.O. Sisterhood.

She co-authored most of her works with Marian Huxoll Talmadge. In 1946 she wrote the screenplay for "Chautauqua, a saga of America" with Talmadge. In 1949, with Talmadge and Alan Swallow, she co-edited the "Anthology for basic communication", published by the University of Denver Press. In 1956 she won the Dodd-Mead Boy's Life prize for the book "Pony Express Boy", co-authored with Talmadge. In 1958, always with Talmadge, she wrote "Wings of Tomorrow", about cadet life at the United States Air Force Academy.

She wrote several non-fiction books for juveniles and on the history of Colorado.

== Personal life ==
Iris Pavey Gilmore moved to Colorado in 1920 and lived at 1316 E. Eleventh Ave., Denver, Colorado. She married Harold McKinley Gilmore.

She died in 1982.

== Legacy ==
The Iris Gilmore Papers (1897-1982) are preserved at the University of Wyoming, American Heritage Center. Most of the topics in the archive relate to Colorado history, including the Ute people. Other topics in the archive are biographical files of painter, Benjamin West and Cheyenne socialite, Anna Broady Haggard and also includes photographs of Wyoming Senator, Joseph C. O'Mahoney. The archive also includes information about early programming on KOA Radio in Denver.
