= List of Alpha Xi Delta chapters =

Alpha Xi Delta Women is a women's fraternity formed at Lombard College in 1893. In the following list, active chapters are indicated in bold and inactive chapters are indicated in italics.

| Chapter | Charter date and range | Institution | City or county | State | Status | Ref. |
|---|---|---|---|---|---|---|
| Alpha (First) | April 17, 1893 – 1930 | Lombard College | Galesburg | Illinois | Moved | (Note: Chapter moved to Knox College in the same city when Lombard College closed.) |
| Beta | June 9, 1902 – 2023 | Iowa Wesleyan University | Mount Pleasant | Iowa | Inactive | (Note: This chapter had originally been the founder of the P.E.O. Sisterhood, now an international women's organization. It broke away to become ΑΞΔ's second chapter) |
| **Gamma** | August 20, 1903 | University of Mount Union | Alliance | Ohio | Active | (Note: Chapter formed from S.L. Club, established in 1894.) |
| **Delta** | June 6, 1903 | Bethany College | Bethany | West Virginia | Active | (Note: Chapter formed from Delta Girls, established in 1902.) |
| **Epsilon** | June 15, 1903 | University of South Dakota | Vermillion | South Dakota | Active | (Note: Chapter formed from R.I. Society, established in 1903.) |
| **Zeta** | May 11, 1904 – 1992; 2016 | Wittenberg University | Springfield | Ohio | Active | (Note: Chapter formed from Sigma Pi, established in 1903.) |
| **Eta** | May 28, 1904 | Syracuse University | Syracuse | New York | Active | (Note: Chapter formed from Kappa Rho, established in 1904.) |
| **Theta** | January 6, 1905 – 1972; 1980–1998; 2015 | University of Wisconsin–Madison | Madison | Wisconsin | Active | (Note: Chapter formed from Zeta Gamma, established in 1904. After going dormant, it reformed as a colony in 1979 and 2014.) |
| **Iota** | May 8, 1905 | West Virginia University | Morgantown | West Virginia | Active | (Note: Chapter formed from Beta Pi, established in 1904.) |
| **Kappa** | December 15, 1905 – 1995; March 13, 2009 | University of Illinois Urbana-Champaign | Champaign | Illinois | Active | (Note: Chapter formed from Omega Omega, established in 1904. After going dormant, it reformed as a colony in 2008.) |
| Lambda | May 8, 1907 – 1957 | Jackson College for Women (Tufts) | Middlesex County | Massachusetts | Inactive | (Note: formed from Tau Epsilon Sigma founded in 1896) |
| Mu | May 25, 1907 – 1960; 1982–1986 | University of Minnesota | Minneapolis | Minnesota | Inactive | (Note: Chapter formed from Lambda Beta, established in 1905. After going dormant, it reformed as a colony in 1982.) |
| **Nu** | May 31, 1907 – 1974; 1980 | University of Washington | Seattle | Washington | Active | (Note: Chapter formed from Sigma Alpha Sigma, established in 1905. After going dormant, it reformed as a colony in 1979.) |
| Xi | September 11, 1908 – 2001 | University of Kentucky | Lexington | Kentucky | Inactive | (Note: Chapter formed from Psi, established in 1905.) |
| Omicron | May 5, 1909 – 1969 | University of California, Berkeley | Berkeley | California | Inactive | (Note: Chapter formed from Del Riada, established in 1906.) |
| **Pi** | April 28, 1911 | Ohio University | Athens | Ohio | Active | (Note: Chapter formed from Gamma Alpha Theta, established in 1909.) |
| **Rho** | June 5, 1912 | University of Nebraska–Lincoln | Lincoln | Nebraska | Active | (Note: Chapter formed from Alpha Delta, established in 1911.) |
| **Sigma** | June 12, 1912 | University of Iowa | Iowa City | Iowa | Active | (Note: Chapter formed from Delta Rho, established in 1911.) |
| **Tau** | September 25, 1914 | University of New Hampshire | Durham | New Hampshire | Active | (Note: Chapter formed from Phi Delta, established in 1913.) |
| Upsilon | February 15, 1915 – 1947 | University of Vermont | Burlington | Vermont | Inactive | (Note: Chapter formed from Alpha Sigma, established in 1914.) |
| **Phi** | December 3, 1915 | Albion College | Albion | Michigan | Active | (Note: Chapter formed from Pierian, established in 1906.) |
| Chi | November 10, 1915 – 1935; May 2, 1992 – September 15, 1998 | University of Kansas | Lawrence | Kansas | Inactive | (Note: Chapter formed from Pi Delta, established in 1913. After going dormant, it reformed as a colony in 1991.) |
| **Psi** | January 14, 1916 | Ohio State University | Columbus | Ohio | Active | (Note: Chapter formed from Alpha Nu, established in 1913.) |
| **Omega** | May 31, 1917 | Stetson University | DeLand | Florida | Active | (Note: Chapter formed from Alpha Phi Delta, established in 1916.) |
| Alpha Alpha | May 17, 1918 – 1938 | University of Pittsburgh | Pittsburgh | Pennsylvania | Inactive | (Note: Chapter formed from Alpha Delta, established in 1917.) |
| **Alpha Beta** | May 21, 1918 – 1964; August 28, 2005 | Cornell University | Ithaca | New York | Active | (Note: Chapter formed from Delta Pi Alpha, established in 1916. After going dormant, it reformed as a colony in 2004.) |
| Alpha Gamma | May 23, 1918 – 1974 | Coe College | Cedar Rapids | Iowa | Inactive | (Note: Chapter formed from Chi Rho Phi, established in 1916.) |
| Alpha Delta | May 30, 1919 – 1964; 1978–19xx ?; 1999 – December 4, 2005 | Oregon State University | Corvallis | Oregon | Inactive | (Note: Chapter formed from Delta Psi, established in 1917. After going dormant, it reformed as a colony in 1979.) |
| Alpha Epsilon | February 18, 1920 – 197x ?; 1985 – April 28, 2000 | University of Michigan | Ann Arbor | Michigan | Inactive | (Note: Chapter formed from Alpha Delta, established in 1919.) |
| Alpha Zeta | May 6, 1921 – 1950; 1984–1985 | University of Oklahoma | Norman | Oklahoma | Inactive | (Note: Chapter formed from Chi Delta, established in 1919. After going dormant, it reformed as a colony in 1983.) |
| **Alpha Eta** | June 9, 1921 | Purdue University | West Lafayette | Indiana | Active | (Note: Chapter formed from Omega Tau, established in 1911.) |
| Alpha Theta | May 11, 1921 – 1974 | Northwestern University | Evanston | Illinois | Inactive | (Note: Chapter formed from Alpha Delta, established in 1920.) |
| Alpha Iota | September 10, 1921 – 1976 | Drake University | Des Moines | Iowa | Inactive | (Note: Chapter formed from Iota Delta Omicron, established in 1909.) |
| **Alpha Kappa** | June 1, 1922 | Kansas State University | Manhattan | Kansas | Active | (Note: Chapter formed from Alpha Xi, established in 1920) |
| Alpha Lambda | June 10, 1922 – 1968 | University of Oregon | Eugene | Oregon | Inactive | (Note: Chapter formed from Zeta Rho Epsilon, established in 1919.) |
| Alpha Mu | May 3, 1924 – 1979 | Ohio Wesleyan University | Delaware | Ohio | Inactive | (Note: Chapter formed from Pi Mu Psi, established in 1922.) |
| Alpha Nu | June 14, 1924 – 1938 | University of Montana | Missoula | Montana | Inactive | (Note: Chapter formed from Omega Xi, established in 1921.) |
| Alpha Xi | June 14, 1924 – 1980 | University of California, Los Angeles | Los Angeles | California | Inactive | (Note: Chapter formed from Gamma Lambda Phi, established in 1919.) |
| Alpha Omicron | June 6, 1925 – 1971 | Hunter College | New York City | New York | Inactive | (Note: Chapter formed from Phi Alpha Alpha.) |
| Alpha Pi | June 13, 1925 – 1965 | Middlebury College | Middlebury | Vermont | Inactive | (Note: Chapter formed from Theta Chi Epsilon, established in 1921.) |
| Alpha Rho | May 29, 1926 – May 1, 1970 | Allegheny College | Meadville | Pennsylvania | Inactive | (Note: Chapter formed from Sigma Tau Sigma, established in 1920.) |
| Alpha Sigma | June 5, 1926 – 1943; 1968–1973 | Washington State University | Pullman | Washington | Inactive | (Note: Chapter formed from Gamma Nu, established in 1922. After going dormant, it reformed as a colony in 1967.) |
| Alpha Tau | May 4, 1927 – 1972; 1981–1988 | University of Alabama | Tuscaloosa | Alabama | Inactive | (Note: Chapter formed from Sigma Pi, established in 1923. After going dormant, it reformed as a colony in 1981.) |
| Alpha Upsilon | May 7, 1927 – June 1941 | Brenau College | Gainesville | Georgia | Inactive | (Note: Chapter formed from Pi Gamma Theta, established in 1925.) |
| Alpha Phi | September 3, 1927 – 1966 | University of Pennsylvania | Philadelphia | Pennsylvania | Inactive | (Note: Chapter formed from Alpha Phi Sigma, established in 1919. Later, it absorbed Beta Phi.) |
| Alpha Chi | May 7, 1928 – 1946 | Randolph-Macon College | Ashland | Virginia | Inactive | (Note: Chapter formed from Gamma Phi Epsilon, established in 1927.) |
| Alpha Psi | March 16, 1929 – 1952; November 8, 1992 – 1994 | University of Denver | Denver | Colorado | Inactive | (Note: Chapter formed from Alpha Theta, established in 1925. After going dormant, it reformed as a colony in 1991.) |
| Alpha Omega | May 15, 1929 – 1980 | Florida State University | Tallahassee | Florida | Inactive | (Note: Chapter formed from Beta Tau, established in 1927. Later, it absorbed Delta Rho.) |
| **Beta Alpha** | May 24, 1929 – 1943; 1963 | University of Texas at Austin | Austin | Texas | Active | (Note: Chapter formed from Phi Omega Upsilon, established in 1925. After going dormant, it reformed as a colony in 1962.) |
| Beta Beta | June 8, 1929 – 1963 | Washington University in St. Louis | St. Louis | Missouri | Inactive | (Note: Chapter formed from Kappa Psi, established in 1927.) |
| Alpha (Second) | September 1929 – 1973; May 1, 2016 | Knox College | Galesburg | Illinois | Active | (Note: Chapter absorbed Zeta Pi with the first initiation at Knox being seven collegiate members and 29 alumni of the local Zeta Pi) |
| Beta Gamma | March 28, 1931 – 1977 | Centenary College | Shreveport | Louisiana | Inactive | (Note: Chapter formed from Zeta Delta, established in 1923.) |
| Beta Delta | October 17, 1931 – January 1948 | Denison University | Granville | Ohio | Inactive | (Note: Chapter formed from Delta Psi, established in 1930.) |
| **Beta Epsilon** | May 14, 1932 – 1980; November 22, 1997 | Monmouth College | Monmouth | Illinois | Active | (Note: Chapter formed from Phi Beta Sigma, established in 1903.) |
| Beta Zeta | December 3, 1932 – September 1961 | Lake Forest College | Lake Forest | Illinois | Inactive | (Note: Chapter formed from Kappa Sigma Tau, established in 1928.) |
| **Beta Eta** | March 3, 1934 – 1994; March 14, 2013 | University of Maryland, College Park | College Park | Maryland | Active | (Note: Chapter formed from Delta Beta Xi, established in 1931.) |
| **Beta Theta** | October 20, 1934 – 2001; February 14, 2014 | Michigan State University | East Lansing | Michigan | Active | (Note: Chapter formed from the Ero-Alphian Literary Society, established in 1904.) |
| Beta Iota | February 19, 1938 – 1988 | Louisiana State University | Baton Rouge | Louisiana | Inactive | |
| Beta Kappa | November 1, 1941 – 1998 | Baldwin-Wallace College | Berea | Ohio | Inactive | |
| **Beta Lambda** | April 18, 1942 | Pennsylvania State University | University Park | Pennsylvania | Active | (Note: Chapter formed from Krimcron (derived from the first letters of colleges that had an Alpha Xi Delta chapter), established in 1941.) |
| **Beta Mu** | April 17, 1943 | Bowling Green State University | Bowling Green | Ohio | Active | (Note: Chapter formed from Five Sisters, established in 1925.) |
| Beta Nu | April 17, 1943 – 2002 | Culver–Stockton College | Canton | Missouri | Inactive | (Note: Chapter formed from Phi Kappa Chi, established in 1921.) |
| **Beta Xi** | May 26, 1945 | Marietta College | Marietta | Ohio | Active | (Note: Chapter formed from Beta Theta, established in 1909.) |
| Beta Omicron | October 20, 1945 – 2002 | Missouri Valley College | Marshall | Missouri | Inactive | (Note: Chapter formed from Valkyr Club, established in 1924.) |
| **Beta Pi** | April 13, 1946 – 1969; April 11, 1987 | Indiana University Bloomington. | Bloomington | Indiana | Active | (Note: Chapter formed from Phi Omega Pi, established in 1922. After going dormant, it reformed as a colony in 1986.) |
| Beta Rho | April 27, 1946 – 1953; 1969–1977 | University of Utah | Salt Lake City | Utah | Inactive | |
| **Beta Sigma** | October 18, 1947 | West Virginia Wesleyan College | Buckhannon | West Virginia | Active | (Note: Chapter formed from Sigma Delta Chi, established in 1921.) |
| **Beta Tau** | November 12, 1947 | Kent State University | Kent | Ohio | Active | (Note: Chapter formed from Gamma Sigma Phi, established in 1927.) |
| **Beta Upsilon** | May 29, 1948 – 2005; 2012 | University of Rhode Island | Kingston | Rhode Island | Active | (Note: Chapter formed from Eta Phi, established in 1946. After going dormant, it reformed in 2012 from Gamma Xi Delta (local), established in 2008.) |
| Beta Phi | May 22, 1948 – 1951 | University of Connecticut | Storrs | Connecticut | Inactive | |
| Beta Chi | February 19, 1949 – 1999 | Gettysburg College | Gettysburg | Pennsylvania | Inactive | (Note: Chapter formed from Chi Alpha Sigma, established in 1942.) |
| **Beta Psi** | September 25, 1949 | Carroll University | Waukesha | Wisconsin | Active | (Note: Chapter formed from Alpha Kappa, established in 1924.) |
| Beta Omega | April 2, 1949 – 1977 | Memphis State University | Memphis | Tennessee | Inactive | |
| Gamma Alpha | January 15, 1949 – 1998 | San Diego State University | San Diego | California | Inactive | (Note: Chapter formed from Delta Chi Phi, established in 1920.) |
| **Gamma Beta** | March 4, 1950 | Marshall University | Huntington | West Virginia | Active | (Note: Chapter formed from Theta Rho, established in 1922.) |
| Gamma Gamma | March 10, 1951 – 1961 | University of Arizona | Tucson | Arizona | Inactive | |
| **Gamma Delta** | June 3, 1951 | University of Nebraska Omaha | Omaha | Nebraska | Active | (Note: Chapter formed from Phi Delta Psi, established in 1922.) |
| Gamma Epsilon | March 23, 1952 – 2011 | California State University, Fresno | Fresno | California | Inactive | (Note: Chapter formed from Sigma Phi Gamma, established in 1922.) |
| **Gamma Zeta** | December 11, 1954 | Eastern Michigan University | Ypsilanti | Michigan | Active | (Note: Chapter formed from Theta Lambda Sigma, established in 1912.) |
| **Gamma Eta** | September 4, 1954 | Georgia Institute of Technology | Atlanta | Georgia | Active | (Note: Chapter formed from Tau Sigma, established in 1953.) |
| **Gamma Theta** | February 4, 1956 – 1978; January 18, 1992 | East Tennessee State University | Johnson City | Tennessee | Active | (Note: Chapter formed from Sigma Theta Kappa, established in 1949.) |
| Gamma Iota | October 5, 1957 – 1984 | University of Memphis at Lambuth | Jackson | Tennessee | Inactive | (Note: Chapter formed from Beta Sigma Alpha, established in 1929.) |
| Gamma Kappa | November 16, 1957 – 1983 | Susquehanna University | Selinsgrove | Pennsylvania | Inactive | (Note: Chapter formed from Nu Sigma Tau, established in 1956.) |
| Gamma Lambda | March 22, 1958 – 1995, 1996–2006 | University of Tennessee | Knoxville | Tennessee | Inactive | |
| Gamma Mu | April 19, 1958 – 1971, 1977–1987 | Ripon College | Ripon | Wisconsin | Inactive | (Note: Chapter formed from Pi Delta Omega, established in 1922. After going dormant, it reformed in 1977 from Kappa Theta, established in 1971.) |
| **Gamma Nu** | May 17, 1958 | Southeast Missouri State University | Cape Girardeau | Missouri | Active | (Note: Chapter formed from Kappa Tau Gamma, established in 1956.) |
| Gamma Xi | May 3, 1958 – 1980 | Valdosta State University | Valdosta | Georgia | Inactive | (Note: Chapter formed from Delta Xi, established in 1956.) |
| Gamma Omicron | April 18, 1959 – 1976 | Central Michigan University | Mount Pleasant | Michigan | Inactive | |
| Gamma Pi | January 10, 1959 – 1985 | Northern Illinois University | DeKalb | Illinois | Inactive | (Note: Chapter formed from Gamma Theta, established in 1954.) |
| Gamma Rho | May 11, 1959 – 1972 | Parsons College | Fairfield | Iowa | Inactive | (Note: Chapter went defunct when the college closed.) |
| **Gamma Sigma** | May 2, 1959 | Thiel College | Greenville | Pennsylvania | Active | (Note: Chapter formed from Alpha Phi Delta, established in 1957.) |
| **Gamma Tau** | May 16, 1959 | Ohio Northern University | Ada | Ohio | Active | (Note: Chapter formed from Tau Kappa Kappa, established in 1904.) |
| **Gamma Upsilon** | January 23, 1960 – 1976; 2023 | University of Georgia | Athens | Georgia | Active | |
| **Gamma Phi** | 1960 | East Carolina University | Greenville | North Carolina | Active | (Note: Chapter formed from Delta Chi Delta, established in 1959.) |
| Gamma Chi | February 6, 1960 – 1979 | Tennessee Wesleyan College | Athens | Tennessee | Inactive | (Note: This chapter originated as Alpha Gamma (local) in 1930. In 1944 it chartered as the Alpha Kappa chapter of Eta Upsilon Gamma. It withdrew to become the Gamma Chi chapter of Alpha Xi Delta in 1961, fairly late into a period of dissolution where most chapters had closed.) |
| Gamma Psi | May 20, 1961 – 2008 | Frostburg State University | Frostburg | Maryland | Inactive | (Note: Chapters formed from Phi Omicron Delta, established in 1938.) |
| **Gamma Omega** | December 2, 1961 | Henderson State University | Arkadelphia | Arkansas | Active | |
| **Delta Alpha** | October 7, 1961 | University of Wisconsin–La Crosse | La Crosse | Wisconsin | Active | (Note: Chapter formed from Alpha Phi Pi, established in 1910.) |
| Delta Beta | April 28, 1962 – 1970 | Southwestern Oklahoma State University | Weatherford | Oklahoma | Inactive | |
| **Delta Gamma** | April 7, 1962 – 1969; January 11, 2014 | University of Nebraska at Kearney | Kearney | Nebraska | Active | (Note: Zeta Chi Alpha, established in 1929. After going dormant, it reformed as a colony in 2013.) |
| Delta Delta | May 5, 1962 – 2014 | Northern Michigan University | Marquette | Michigan | Inactive | (Note: Chapter formed from Delta Sigma Nu, established in 1923.) |
| **Delta Epsilon** | May 12, 1962 | University of New Orleans | New Orleans | Louisiana | Active | (Note: Chapter formed from Delta Epsilon Beta, established in 1958.) |
| **Delta Zeta** | November 10, 1962 – 1976; April 4, 1992 | LIU Post | Brookville | New York | Active | (Note: Chapter formed from Beta Beta Chi, established in 1961. After going dormant, it reformed as a colony in 1991.) |
| Delta Eta | December 8, 1961 – 1981 | California State College | California | Pennsylvania | Inactive | (Note: Chapter formed from Beta Chi Epsilon, established in 1961.) |
| Delta Theta | May 11, 1963 – 1977 | St. Cloud State University | St. Cloud | Minnesota | Inactive | (Note: Chapter formed from Athenaeum, established in 1904.) |
| Delta Iota | May 4, 1963 – 1980 | Chadron State College | Chadron | Nebraska | Inactive | (Note: Chapter formed from Alpha Phi Pi, established in 1911.) |
| **Delta Kappa** | April 6, 1963 – 1981; November 1987 | Slippery Rock University | Slippery Rock | Pennsylvania | Active | (Note: Chapter formed from Delta Sigma, established in 1960.) |
| **Delta Lambda** | October 5, 1963 | Rochester Institute of Technology | Henrietta | New York | Active | (Note: Chapter formed from Phi Upsilon Phi, established in 1919.) |
| **Delta Mu** | February 15, 1964 | Old Dominion University | Norfolk | Virginia | Active | (Note: Chapter formed from Alpha Omega Phi, established in 1930.) |
| **Delta Nu** | September 21, 1963 | Indiana University of Pennsylvania | Indiana | Pennsylvania | Active | (Note: Chapter formed from Omega Phi, established in 1961.) |
| **Delta Xi** | October 26, 1963 | Georgia State University | Atlanta | Georgia | Active | (Note: Chapter formed from Kappa Theta, established in 1937.) |
| Delta Omicron | November 2, 1963 – 1982 | Fairmont State University | Fairmont | West Virginia | Inactive | (Note: Chapter formed from Alpha Delta Chi, established in 1929.) |
| Delta Pi | May 19, 1964 – 2022 | Defiance College | Defiance | Ohio | Inactive | (Note: Chapter formed from Phi Delta Delta, established in 1960.) |
| **Delta Rho** | October 31, 1964 | California State University, Northridge | Los Angeles | California | Active | (Note: Chapter formed from Chi Sigma Delta, established in 1957.) |
| **Delta Sigma** | March 14, 1964 | Ferris State University | Big Rapids | Michigan | Active | (Note: Chapter formed from Theta Tau Omega, established in 1958.) |
| **Delta Tau** | December 11, 1965 – 1972; 1987 | University of Wisconsin–Oshkosh | Oshkosh | Wisconsin | Active | (Note: Chapter formed from Gamma Sigma, established in 1922. After going dormant, it reformed from Kappa Rho Delta (local), established in 1986.) |
| Delta Upsilon | May 22, 1965 – 1981 | University of Wisconsin–Superior | Superior | Wisconsin | Inactive | (Note: Chapter formed from Alpha Kappa, established in 1916.) |
| Delta Phi | 1965 – 1983 | University of Charleston | Charleston | West Virginia | Inactive | (Note: Chapter formed from Sigma Iota Chi, established in 1936.) |
| **Delta Chi** | May 15, 1965 | University of Northern Iowa | Cedar Falls | Iowa | Active | (Note: Chapter formed from Tau Sigma Delta, established in 1920.) |
| **Delta Psi** | April 25, 1965 | Texas State University | San Marcos | Texas | Active | (Note: Chapter formed from Phi Delta Gamma, established in 1923.) |
| Delta Omega | November 6, 1965 – 1984 | Winona State University | Winona | Minnesota | Inactive | (Note: Chapter formed from Winona Keys Delta, established in 1964.) |
| **Epsilon Alpha** | December 4, 1965 | University of Wisconsin–Eau Claire | Eau Claire | Wisconsin | Active | (Note: Chapter formed from Sigma Pi Kappa, established in 1941.) |
| Epsilon Beta | October 30, 1965 – 1977 | Findlay College | Findlay | Ohio | Inactive | (Note: Chapter formed from Sigma Delta Epsilon, established in 1961.) |
| Epsilon Gamma | May 7, 1966 –2021 | Western Carolina University | Cullowhee | North Carolina | Inactive | (Note: Chapter formed from Alpha Delta Chi, established in 1964.) |
| Epsilon Delta | May 14, 1966 – 1985 | Indiana State University | Terre Haute | Indiana | Inactive | |
| Epsilon Epsilon | May 21, 1966 – 1970 | California State University, Sacramento | Sacramento | California | Inactive | (Note: Chapter formed from Delta Sigma Nu, established in 1960.) |
| **Epsilon Zeta** | October 19, 1966 – 1971; February 15, 1992 | Eastern Washington University | Cheney | Washington | Active | (Note: Chapter formed from Pi Phi Omega Epsilon, established in 1963. After going dormant, it reformed in 1992 from Kappa Phi (local), established in 1991.) |
| **Epsilon Eta** | November 15, 1968 | South Dakota State University | Brookings | South Dakota | Active | |
| **Epsilon Theta** | October 29, 1966 | West Liberty State College | West Liberty | West Virginia | Active | (Note: Chapter formed from Iota Psi Alpha, established in 1929.) |
| **Epsilon Iota** | April 22, 1967 – 1994, 2012 | Newberry College | Newberry | South Carolina | Active | (Note: Chapter formed from Kappa Tau, established in 1966. After going dormant it reformed as a colony in 2011.) |
| **Epsilon Kappa** | April 1, 1967 – 1994, January 29, 2012 | Western Kentucky University | Bowling Green | Kentucky | Active | |
| **Epsilon Lambda** | April 4, 1967 | Rider University | Lawrence Township | New Jersey | Active | (Note: Chapter formed from Sigma Iota Chi, established in 1929.) |
| Epsilon Mu | September 30, 1967 – 1993 | University of Northern Colorado | Greeley | Colorado | Inactive | |
| **Epsilon Nu** | February 3, 1968 – 1972; February 24, 1985 | University of Hartford | West Hartford | Connecticut | Active | (Note: Chapter formed from Delta Phi Alpha, established in 1958. After going dormant, it reformed as a colony in 1984.) |
| Epsilon Xi | January 27, 1968 – 2023 | University of Missouri–St. Louis | St. Louis | Missouri | Inactive | (Note: Chapter formed from Alpha Epsilon Omicron.) |
| Epsilon Omicron | March 16, 1968 – 1981; January 31, 2015 – 2024 | Oklahoma State University | Stillwater | Oklahoma | Inactive | |
| **Epsilon Pi** | March 2, 1968 | Jacksonville State University | Jacksonville | Alabama | Active | |
| **Epsilon Rho** | September 28, 1968 | University of Southern Maine | Portland | Maine | Active | (Note: Chapter formed from Sigma Chi Omega, established in 1967.) |
| Epsilon Sigma | May 18, 1968 – 1980; 1994–1999 | Georgia Southern University | Statesboro | Georgia | Inactive | |
| Epsilon Tau | February 1, 1969 – 1990 | Central Missouri State University | Warrensburg | Missouri | Inactive | (Note: Chapter formed from Theta Sigma Nu, established in 1968.) |
| Epsilon Upsilon | March 15, 1969 – 1975 | Woodbury University | Burbank | California | Inactive | (Note: Chapter formed from Sigma Iota Chi, established in the 1930s.) |
| Epsilon Phi | March 22, 1969 – 2003 | Iowa State University | Ames | Iowa | Inactive | |
| Epsilon Chi | October 11, 1969 – 1977 | Villanova University | Villanova | Pennsylvania | Inactive | (Note: Chapter formed from Pi Theta Chi, established in 1955.) |
| **Epsilon Psi** | May 3, 1969 – 1973; February 8, 2003 | Boise State University | Boise | Idaho | Active | |
| Epsilon Omega | November 22, 1969 – 1989 | University of North Texas | Denton | Texas | Inactive | (Note: Chapter formed from Sigma Eta, established in 1968.) |
| **Zeta Alpha** | February 14, 1970 – 1977 | Jacksonville University | Jacksonville | Florida | Active | (Note: Chapter formed from Sigma Tau Epsilon, established in 1948.) |
| Zeta Beta | March 21, 1970 – 1985 | Clarion University of Pennsylvania | Clarion | Pennsylvania | Inactive | (Note: Chapter formed from Delta Lambda Tau, established in 1968.) |
| Zeta Gamma | February 6, 1971 – 1976 | University of Mississippi | Oxford | Mississippi | Inactive | |
| Zeta Delta | April 11, 1970 – 1977 | Indiana University South Bend | South Bend | Indiana | Inactive | (Note: Chapter formed from Delta Sigma Nu, established in 1968.) |
| Zeta Epsilon | October 3, 1970 – 1980 | Edinboro State College | Edinboro | Pennsylvania | Inactive | (Note: Chapter formed from Kappa Mu Delta, established in 1967.) |
| Zeta Zeta | December 5, 1970 – 1978 | Northern State University | Aberdeen | South Dakota | Inactive | (Note: Chapter formed from Alpha Zeta Epsilon, established in 1969.) |
| **Zeta Eta** | April 17, 1971 | West Chester University | West Chester | Pennsylvania | Active | (Note: Chapter formed from Delta Psi Omega, established in 1969.) |
| **Zeta Theta** | September 16, 1972 | Wright State University | Fairborn | Ohio | Active | |
| **Zeta Iota** | January 13, 1973 | Lyon College | Batesville | Arkansas | Active | (Note: Chapter formed from Sigma Alpha Sigma, established in 1904.) |
| Zeta Kappa | November 10, 1973 – 1979 | University of Pittsburgh at Johnstown | Johnstown | Pennsylvania | Inactive | (Note: Chapter formed from Alpha Kappa Pi, established in 1963.) |
| **Zeta Lambda** | March 8, 1975 | Texas Wesleyan University | Fort Worth | Texas | Active | (Note: Chapter formed from the Deka Club, established in 1934.) |
| Zeta Mu | April 27, 1974 – 1987; 2002–2005 | Methodist University | Fayetteville | North Carolina | Inactive | |
| **Zeta Nu** | February 23, 1980 – 2010; 2012-2014; 2019 | Miami University | Oxford | Ohio | Active | |
| **Zeta Xi** | January 19, 1980 | Auburn University | Auburn | Alabama | Active | |
| Zeta Omicron | May 16, 1981 – 1988; 1991–2003 | University of Florida | Gainesville | Florida | Inactive | |
| Zeta Pi | May 14, 1982 – 1985 | Lincoln Memorial University | Harrogate | Tennessee | Inactive | (Note: Chapter formed from Kappa Pi Omega, established in 1924.) |
| **Zeta Rho** | April 16, 1983 – 1990; 2023 | North Carolina State University | Raleigh | North Carolina | Active | |
| Zeta Sigma | April 30, 1983 – 2004 | Hillsdale College | Hillsdale, Michigan | Michigan | Inactive | |
| Zeta Tau | May 25, 1985 – August 2021 | University of North Carolina at Asheville | Asheville | North Carolina | Inactive | (Note: 25 of the chapter's members quit over claims of racism at the national level; later, the sorority withdrew its charter for lack of compliance with policies.) |
| **Zeta Upsilon** | September 20, 1986 | Alma College | Alma | Michigan | Active | (Note: Chapter formed from Alpha Zeta Tau, established in 1902) |
| Zeta Phi | January 31, 1987 – 2011 | Binghamton University | Binghamton | New York | Inactive | (Note: Chapter formed from A.O.K., established in 1985.) |
| **Zeta Chi** | March 28, 1987 | University of North Carolina Wilmington | Wilmington | North Carolina | Active | (Note: Chapter formed from Beta Chi Omega, established in 1985.) |
| Zeta Psi | October 10, 1987 – 1993 | University of Virginia | Charlottesville | Virginia | Inactive | (Note: Chapter formed from Alpha Xi, established in 1986.) |
| **Zeta Omega** | February 11, 1989 | University of West Georgia | Carrollton | Georgia | Active | |
| **Theta Alpha** | April 22, 1990 | Millersville University of Pennsylvania | Millersville | Pennsylvania | Active | (Note: Chapter formed from Theta Omega Sigma, established in 1966.) |
| **Theta Beta** | November 5, 1989 | Sonoma State University | Rohnert Park | California | Active | (Note: Chapter formed from Alpha Delta Zeta.) |
| **Theta Gamma** | April 7, 1990 | University of Delaware | Newark | Delaware | Active | |
| **Theta Delta** | April 8, 1990 | Towson University | Towson | Maryland | Active | (Note: Chapter formed from Alpha Sigma Delta, established in 1988.) |
| **Theta Epsilon** | November 11, 1990 | Marquette University | Milwaukee | Wisconsin | Active | (Note: Chapter formed from Kappa Zeta, established in 1989.) |
| **Theta Zeta** | April 13, 1991 | Embry–Riddle Aeronautical University, Prescott | Prescott | Arizona | Active | |
| **Theta Eta** | April 14, 1991 | Western Michigan University | Kalamazoo | Michigan | Active | (Note: Chapter formed from Kappa Gamma, established in 1985.) |
| **Theta Theta** | April 28, 1991 | Brooklyn College | Brooklyn, New York | New York | Active | (Note: Chapter formed from Alpha Zeta Delta, established in 1989.) |
| **Theta Iota** | August 24, 1991 | Florida Atlantic University | Boca Raton | Florida | Active | |
| Theta Kappa | April 5, 1992 – 2019 | State University of New York at Albany | Albany | New York | Inactive | (Note: Chapter formed from Phi Gamma, established in 1898.) |
| **Theta Lambda** | April 25, 1992 | Southwestern University | Georgetown | Texas | Active | |
| Theta Mu | November 14, 1992 – 2003 | Case Western Reserve University | Cleveland | Ohio | Inactive | |
| **Theta Nu** | February 13, 1993 | Elon University | Elon | North Carolina | Active | |
| **Theta Xi** | April 20, 1992 | Florida International University | Miami | Florida | Active | (Note: Chapter formed from Xi Delta, established in 1990.) |
| **Theta Omicron** | February 21, 1993 | Embry–Riddle Aeronautical University, Daytona Beach | Daytona Beach | Florida | Active | |
| **Theta Pi** | April 30, 1994 | Christian Brothers University | Memphis | Tennessee | Active | (Note: Chapter formed from Chi Delta Omega, established in 1991.) |
| **Theta Rho** | February 25, 1995 | California State University San Marcos | San Marcos | California | Active | (Note: Chapter formed from Kappa Chi Omega, established in 1992.) |
| **Theta Sigma** | February 25, 1995 | University of Central Florida | Orlando | Florida | Active | |
| Theta Tau | November 4, 1995 – 2023 | Marian University | Fond du Lac | Wisconsin | Inactive | (Note: Chapter formed from Alpha Sigma Delta, established in 1993.) |
| **Theta Upsilon** | April 13, 1996 | Youngstown State University | Youngstown | Ohio | Active | (Note: Chapter formed from Xi Delta Gamma, established in 1989.) |
| **Theta Phi** | January 25, 1997 | University of Alabama at Birmingham | Birmingham | Alabama | Active | |
| **Theta Chi** | August 9, 1997 | University of Toledo | Toledo | Ohio | Active | |
| **Theta Psi** | February 21, 1998 | Dartmouth College | Hanover | New Hampshire | Active | (Note: Chapter formed from Delta Pi Omega, established in 1996.) |
| **Theta Omega** | May 2, 1998 | New Mexico State University | Las Cruces | New Mexico | Active | |
| **Iota Alpha** | November 14, 1998 | George Mason University | Fairfax, Virginia | Virginia | Active | |
| **Iota Beta** | November 12, 1998 | California State University, Stanislaus | Turlock | California | Active | |
| Iota Gamma | April 17, 1999 – 2002 | Rockhurst University | Kansas City | Missouri | Inactive | |
| **Iota Delta** | May 1, 1999 | University of Central Oklahoma | Edmond | Oklahoma | Active | |
| **Iota Epsilon** | May 8, 1999 | University of Nevada, Las Vegas | Paradise | Nevada | Active | (Note: Chapter formed from Delta Kappa Delta, established in 1993.) |
| **Iota Zeta** | September 14, 2002 | Wingate University | Wingate | North Carolina | Active | |
| **Iota Eta** | April 26, 2003 | University of Texas at El Paso | El Paso | Texas | Active | (Note: Chapter formed from Delta Epsilon Beta, established in 1937.) |
| Iota Theta | April 3, 2004 – 2015 | Southern Polytechnic State University | Marietta | Georgia | Inactive | (Note: Iota Theta Chapter became Inactive when it merged withKappa Alphachapter when Southern Polytechnic State University merged with Kennesaw State.) |
| **Iota Iota** | December 4, 2004 | Greensboro College | Greensboro | North Carolina | Active | |
| **Iota Kappa** | February 26, 2005 | Idaho State University | Pocatello | Idaho | Active | |
| **Iota Lambda** | February 27, 2005 | St. Norbert College | De Pere | Wisconsin | Active | (Note: Chapter formed from Alpha Sigma Chi, established in 1968.) |
| **Iota Mu** | February 27, 2005 | Lycoming College | Williamsport | Pennsylvania | Active | |
| **Iota Nu** | April 22, 2007 | Monmouth University | West Long Branch | New Jersey | Active | |
| **Iota Xi** | October 6, 2007 | Worcester Polytechnic Institute | Worcester | Massachusetts | Active | |
| **Iota Omicron** | January 24, 2010 | San Jose State University | San Jose | California | Active | |
| **Iota Pi** | April 17, 2011 | Coastal Carolina University | Conway | South Carolina | Active | |
| **Iota Rho** | February 19, 2012 | DePaul University | Chicago | Illinois | Active | |
| Iota Sigma | April 29, 2012 – 2023 | Virginia Commonwealth University | Richmond | Virginia | Inactive | |
| **Iota Tau** | April 20, 2013 | Bucknell University | Lewisburg | Pennsylvania | Active | |
| **Iota Upsilon** | January 26, 2014 | Southern Illinois University Edwardsville | Edwardsville | Illinois | Active | |
| Iota Phi | April 12, 2014 – 2021 | American University | Washington, D.C. | District of Columbia | Inactive | |
| **Iota Chi** | May 3, 2014 | Temple University | Philadelphia | Pennsylvania | Active | |
| **Iota Psi** | December 7, 2014 | Franklin & Marshall College | Lancaster | Pennsylvania | Active | |
| **Iota Omega** | February 28, 2015 | The College of New Jersey | Ewing Township | New Jersey | Active | |
| **Kappa Alpha** | February 7, 2016 | Kennesaw State University | Cobb County | Georgia | Active | |
| **Kappa Beta** | February 21, 2016 | Texas Tech University | Lubbock | Texas | Active | |
| **Kappa Gamma** | September 12, 2016 | University of South Carolina | Columbia | South Carolina | Active | |
| **Kappa Delta** | October 23, 2016 | California State Polytechnic University, Pomona | Pomona | California | Active | |
| **Alpha Deuteron** | | Initiated at National Convention | | | | |
