= Rusty Bailey =

American politician

17th Mayor of Riverside
- In office November 2012 – December 8, 2020
- Preceded by: Ronald O. Loveridge
- Succeeded by: Patricia Lock Dawson

Personal details
- Born: William Russell Bailey III Riverside, California, U.S.
- Party: Democratic
- Children: 2
- Education: United States Military Academy (BS); University of California, Los Angeles (MPP); California State University, San Bernardino (GrDip)

Military service
- Branch/service: United States Army

William R. "Rusty" Bailey III is an American educator and former politician who served as the 17th Mayor of Riverside, California. Elected in 2012, Bailey succeeded Ronald O. Loveridge.

== Early life and education ==
Rusty Bailey was born and raised in Riverside, California. He earned a Bachelor of Science in political science from the United States Military Academy in 1994 and served as a United States Army helicopter pilot. He earned a Master of Arts degree in public policy from the University of California, Los Angeles. He received a teaching credential from California State University, San Bernardino.

== Career ==
Rusty Bailey worked in the United States Department of Housing and Urban Development and Executive Office of the President as a part of the two-year Presidential Management Fellows Program. He later returned to Riverside and worked as a legislative aide to County Supervisor John F. Tavaglione. He was employed at the Riverside County Economic Development Agency and taught high school government at Riverside Polytechnic High School.

Bailey served as a member of the Riverside City Council from 2007 to 2012. In 2012, Bailey began his bid for Mayor, running in a field that included 3 of his Council colleagues, including Ed Adkison, Andy Melendrez and Mike Gardner. After receiving 32.6% of the vote in the primary election, Bailey entered into a run-off election against Ed Adkison, and successfully won the race with 58.2% of the vote. Bailey was sworn in as the 17th mayor of the City of Riverside in 2012 and was re-elected in 2016.

In 2019, Bailey announced that he would not seek another term as mayor and focus his efforts on the local homeless crisis as a non-profit executive for Path of Life Ministries. He currently works as a teacher at Poly High School.

== Personal life ==
Bailey and his wife, Judy, have two daughters.
