= Riverside, California =

- City
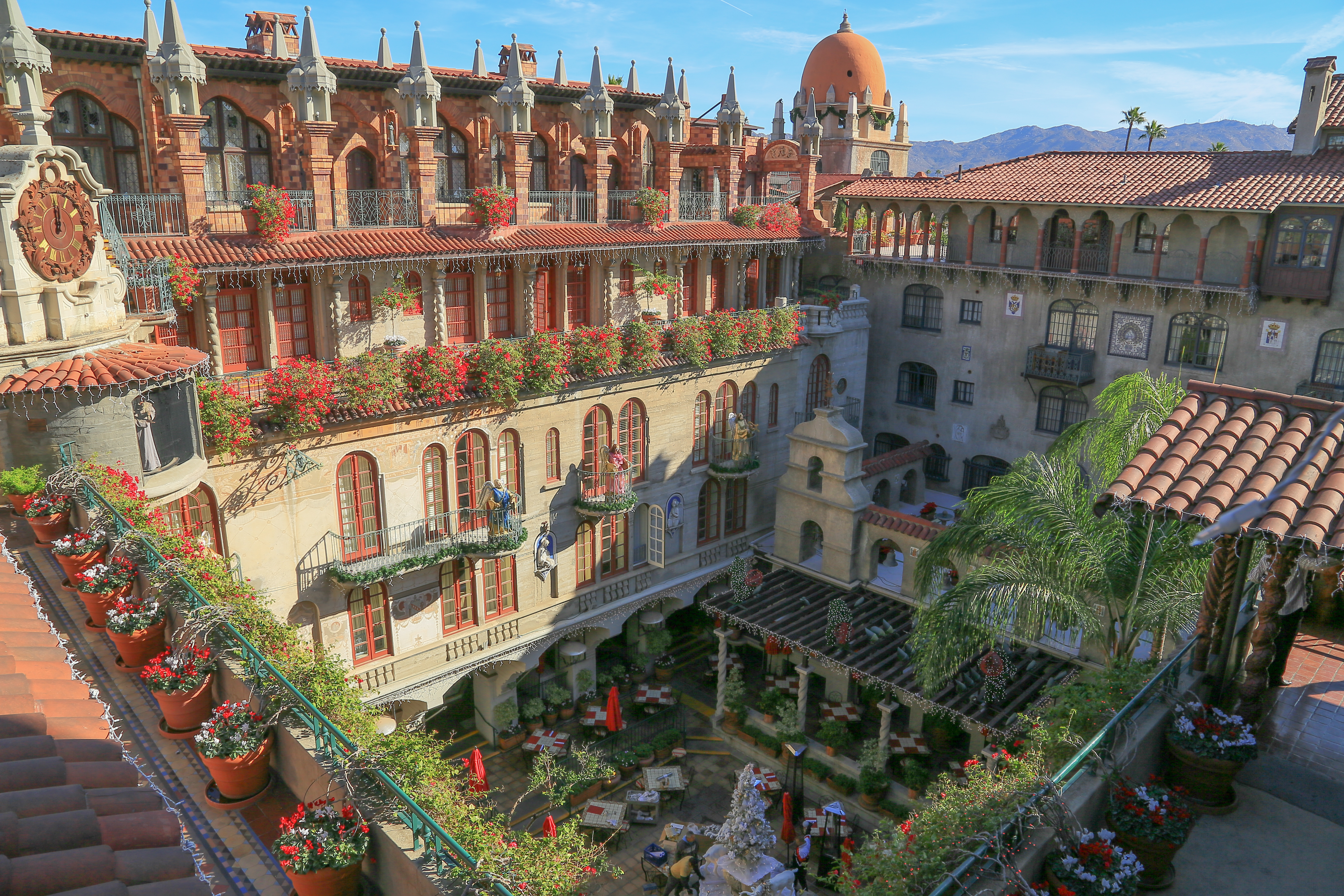
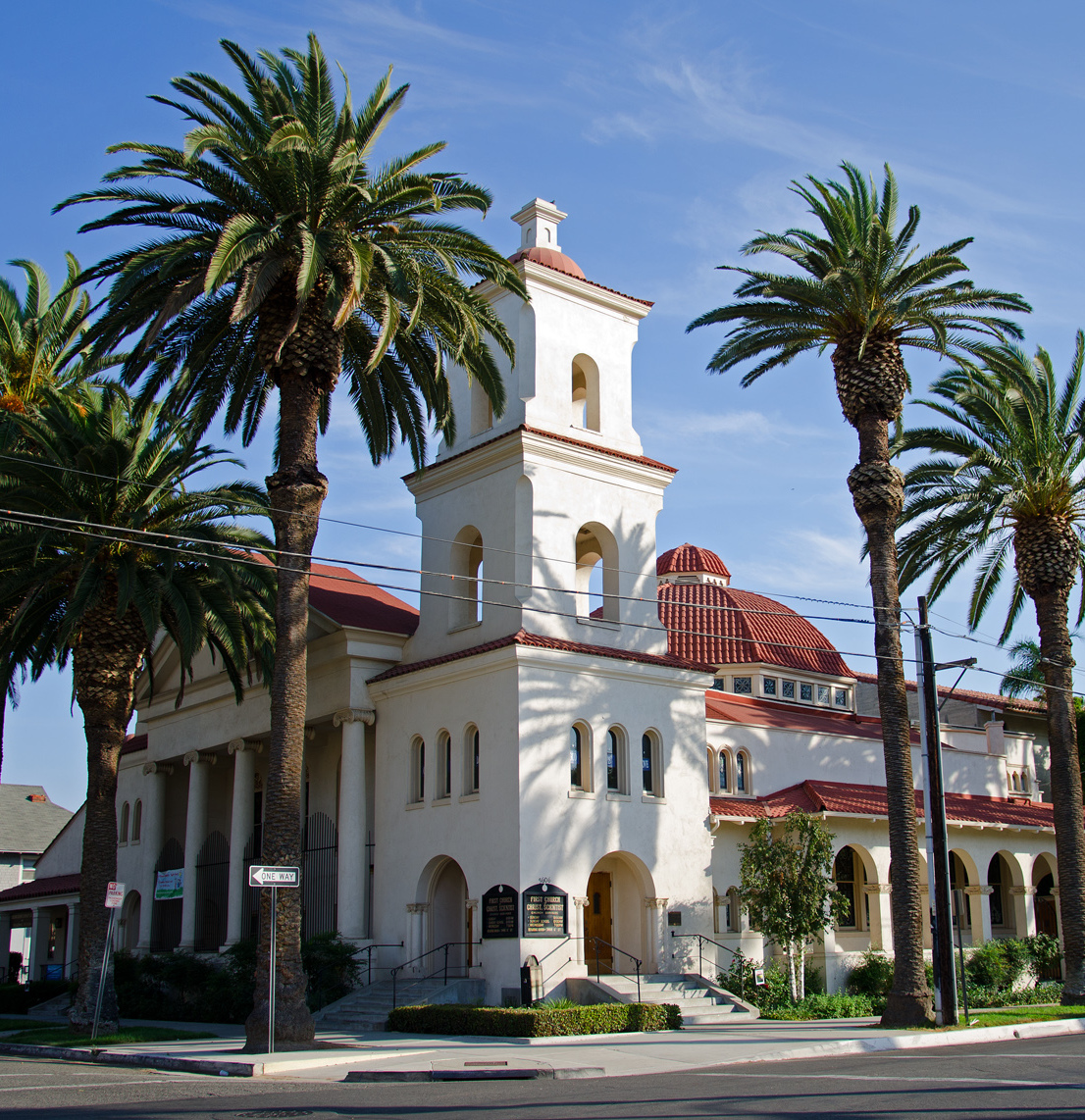
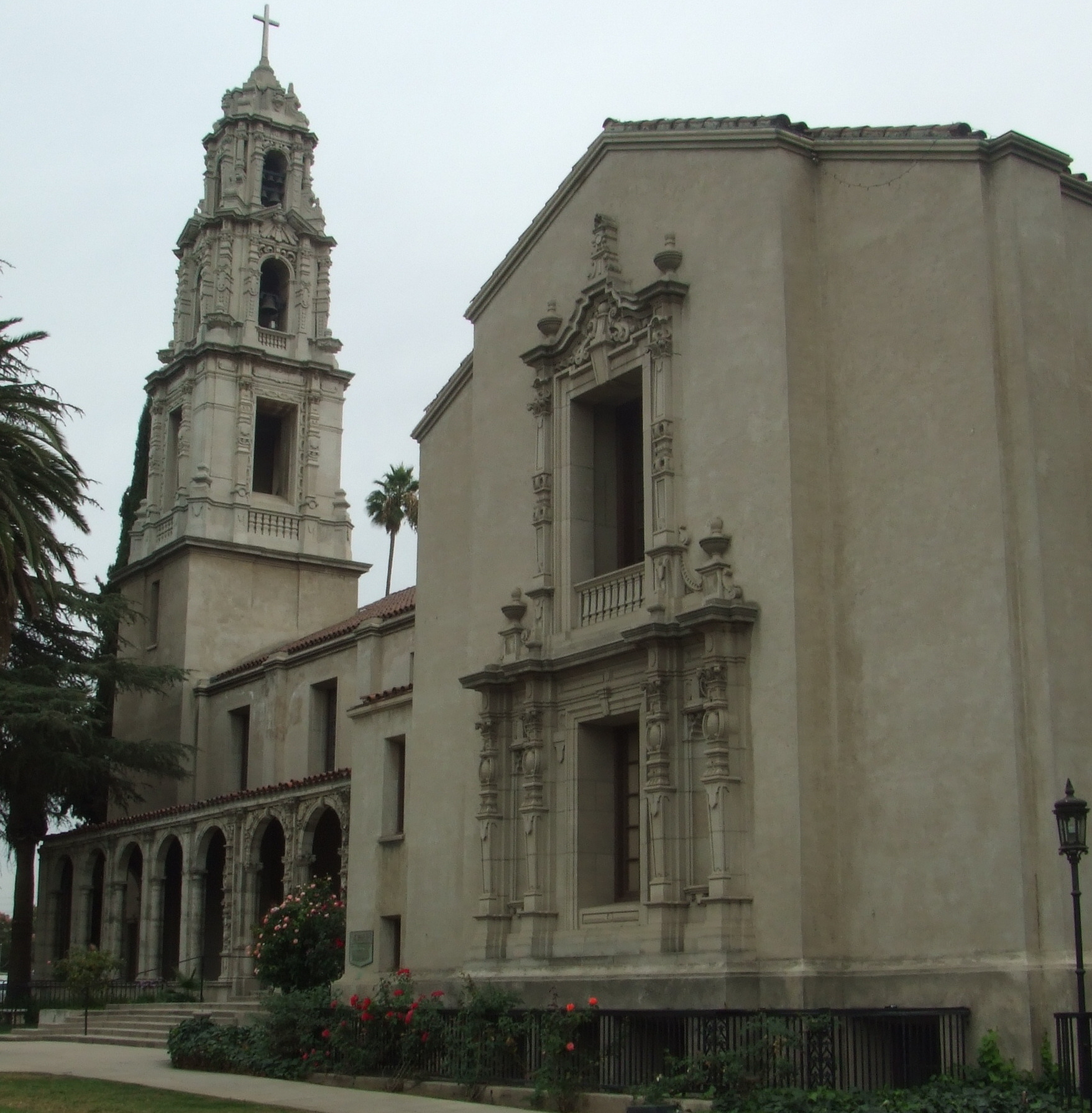
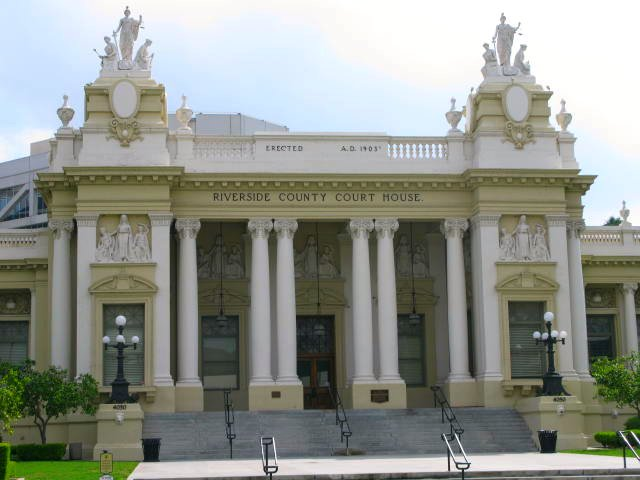
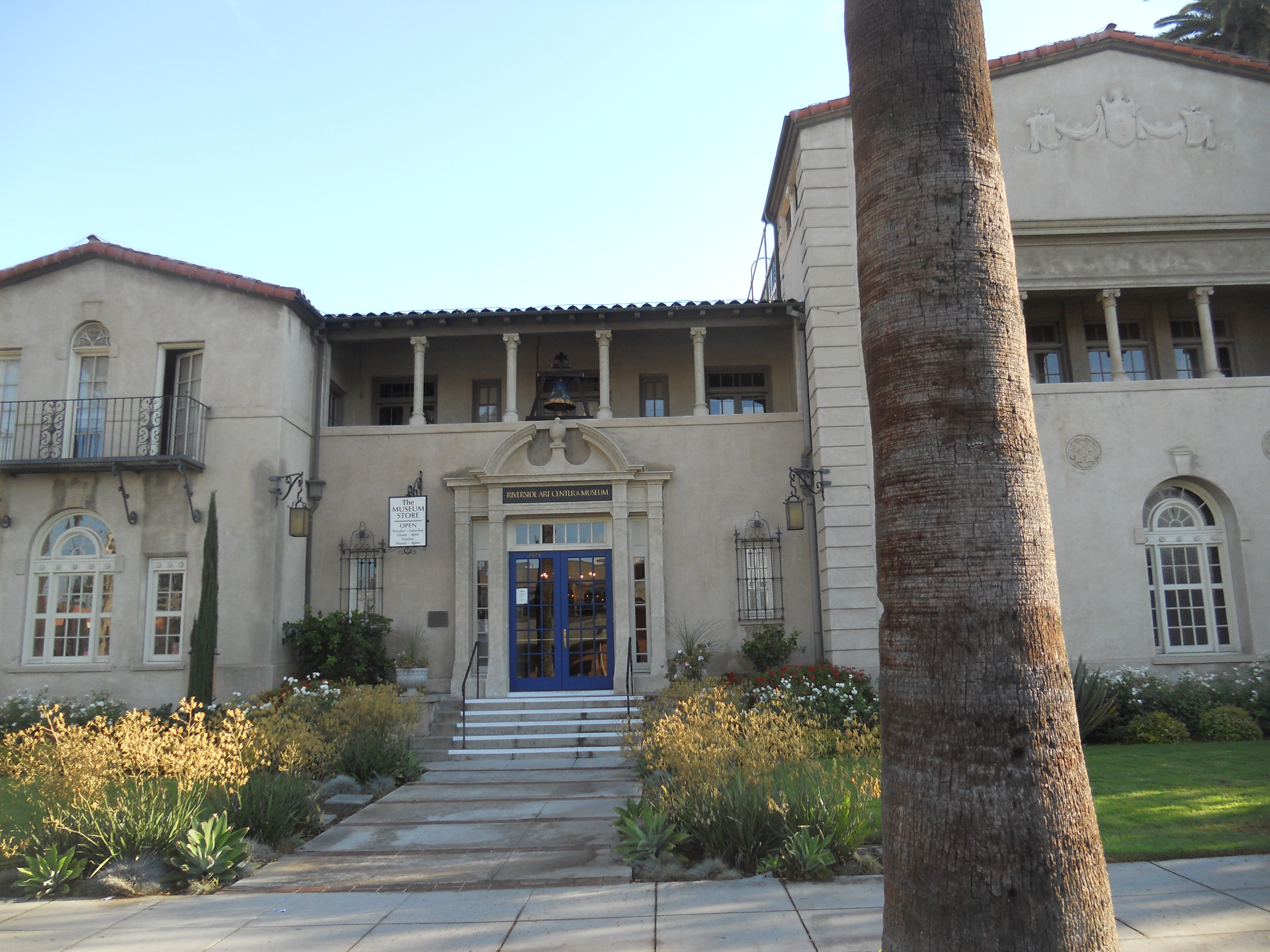
- Mission Inn First Church of Christ First Congregational Church Riverside County Superior Court Riverside Art Museum

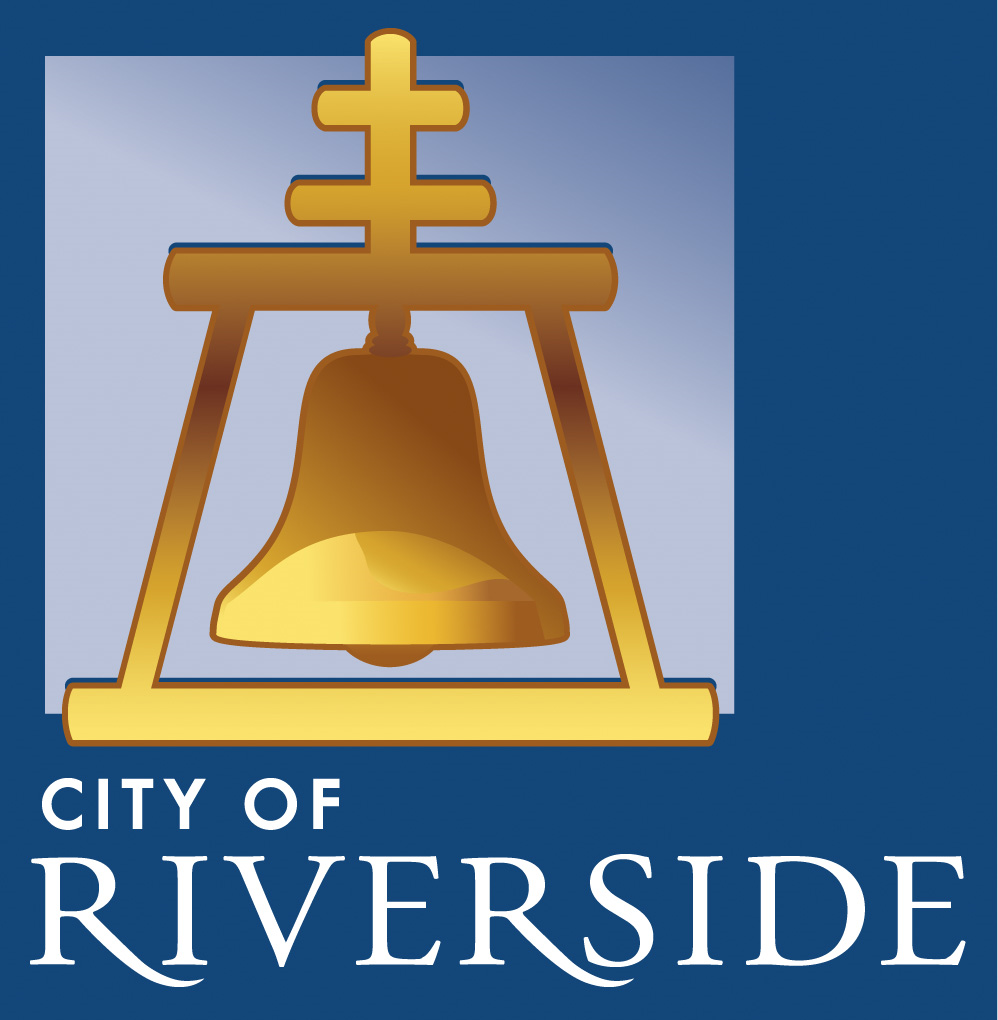
- Flag Seal
- Motto: City of Arts & Innovation
- Interactive map of Riverside, California
- Location within California Location within the United States
- Coordinates: 33°56′53″N 117°23′46″W
- Country: United States
- State: California
- County: Riverside
- Incorporated: October 11, 1883; 143 years ago
- Chartered: March 5, 1907; 119 years ago

Government
  - Type: Council–manager
  - Mayor: Patricia Lock Dawson (I)
  - City manager: Thomas Hatch (interim)

Area
  - City: 81.54 sq mi (211.18 km^{2})
  - Land: 81.23 sq mi (210.38 km^{2})
  - Water: 0.31 sq mi (0.80 km^{2})
- Elevation: 827 ft (252 m)

Population (2020)
  - City: 314,998
  - Estimate (2025): 323,057 ▲
  - Rank: 1st in Riverside County; 12th in California; 62nd in the United States
  - Density: 3,877.9/sq mi (1,497.28/km^{2})
  - Urban: 2,276,703 (US: 19th)
  - Urban density: 3,741/sq mi (1,444.4/km^{2})
  - Metro: 4,744,214 (US: 12th)
- Time zone: UTC−8 (Pacific)
  - Summer (DST): UTC−7 (PDT)
- ZIP Codes: 92501–92509, 92513–92519, 92521–92522
- Area code: 951
- FIPS code: 06-62000
- GNIS feature IDs: 1661315, 2410965
- Website: riversideca.gov

Riverside is a city in and the county seat of Riverside County, California, United States. It is named for its location beside the Santa Ana River in Southern California. It is the most populous city in the Inland Empire and Riverside County, 12th-most populous city in California, and 62nd-most populous city in the U.S. with a population of 314,998 at the 2020 census. The Riverside–San Bernardino metropolitan area at 4.74 million residents is the 12th-largest metropolitan area in the nation. Riverside is about 50 miles (80 km) east of downtown Los Angeles and is also part of the Greater Los Angeles area.

Riverside was founded in the early 1870s. It is the birthplace of the California citrus industry and home of the Mission Inn, the nation's largest Mission Revival Style building. It is also home to the Riverside National Cemetery and the Eastern Division of the Federal District Court for the Central District of California.

The University of California, Riverside, is in the northeastern part of the city. The university hosts the Riverside Sports Complex. Other attractions in Riverside include the Fox Performing Arts Center, Museum of Riverside, which houses exhibits and artifacts of local history, The Cheech Marin Center for Chicano Art & Culture, the California Museum of Photography, the California Citrus State Historic Park, Castle Park, and the Parent Washington Navel Orange Tree, the last of California's two original navel orange trees.

== History ==
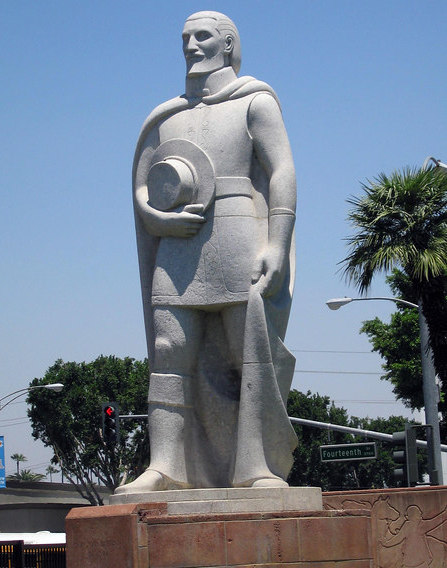
Statue in Downtown Riverside of famed Spanish explorer Juan Bautista de Anza, whose expedition came through the area in 1774

In the late 18th century and the early 19th century, the area was inhabited by Cahuilla and the Serrano people. Californios such as Bernardo Yorba and Juan Bandini established ranches during the first half of the 19th century.

In the 1860s, Louis Prevost launched the California Silk Center Association, a short-lived experiment in sericulture. In the wake of its failure, John W. North purchased some of its land and formed the Southern California Colony Association to promote the area's development. In March 1870, North distributed posters announcing the formation of a colony in California. North, a staunch temperance-minded abolitionist from the State of New York, had formerly founded Northfield, Minnesota. Riverside was temperance-minded, and Republican. There were four saloons in Riverside when it was founded. The license fees were raised until the saloons moved out of Riverside. Investors from England and Canada transplanted traditions and activities adopted by prosperous citizens. As a result, the first golf course and polo field in southern California were built in Riverside.

The first orange trees were planted in 1871, with the citrus industry Riverside is famous for beginning three years later (1874) when Eliza Tibbets received three Brazilian navel orange trees sent to her by a personal friend, William Saunders, a horticulturist at the United States Department of Agriculture in Washington, D.C.

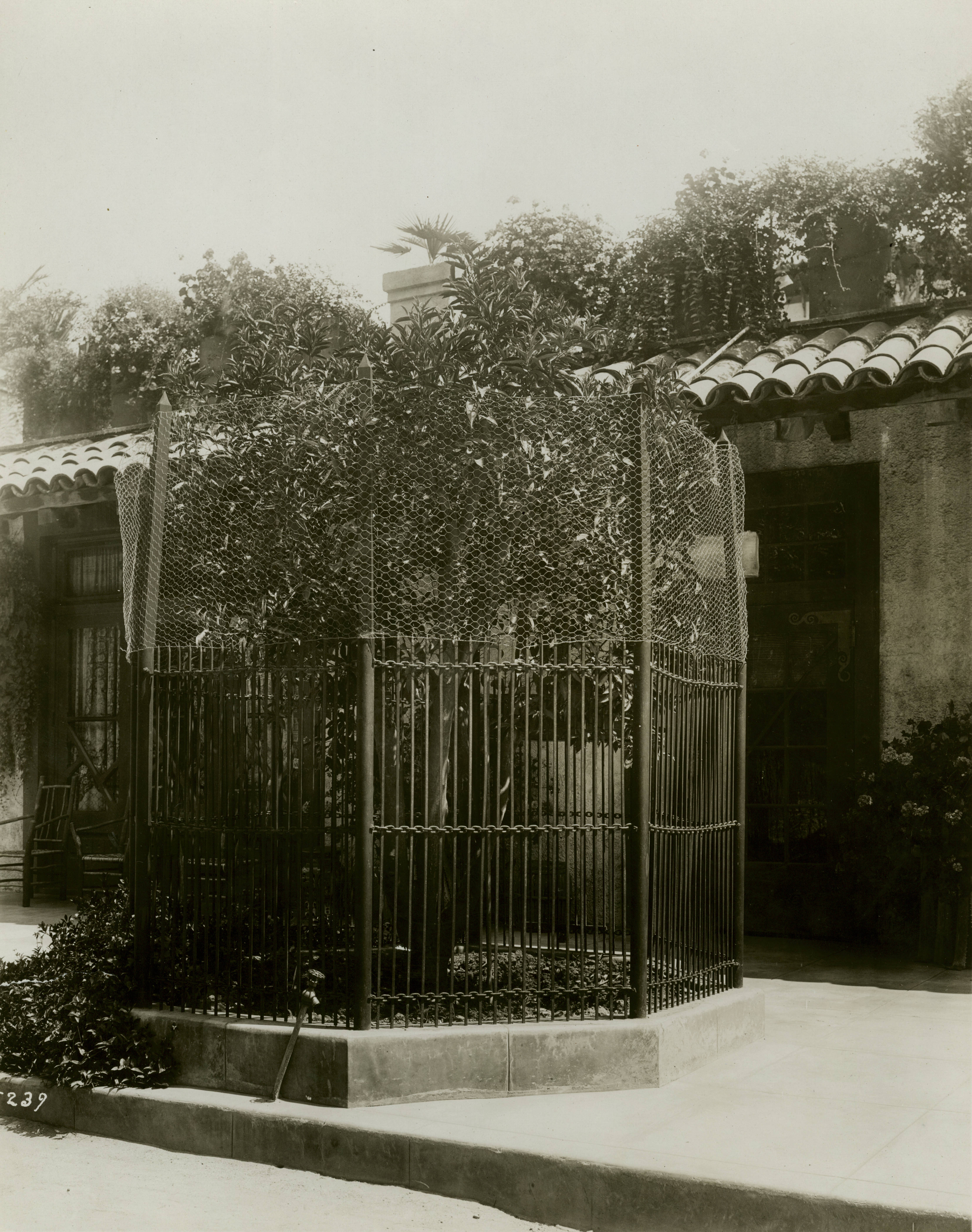
One of the first three navel orange trees in California, this one replanted at the Mission Inn by President Theodore Roosevelt in 1903. Photo c. 1910.

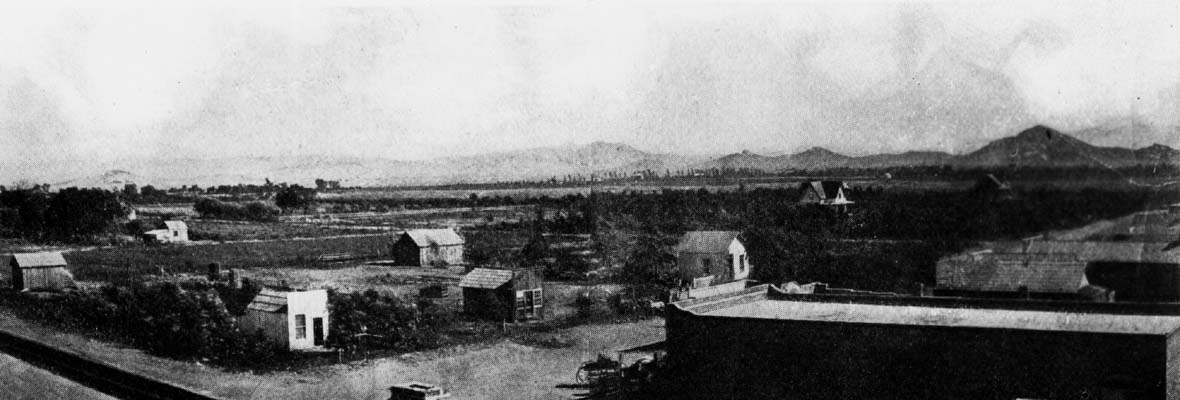
Riverside, 1876

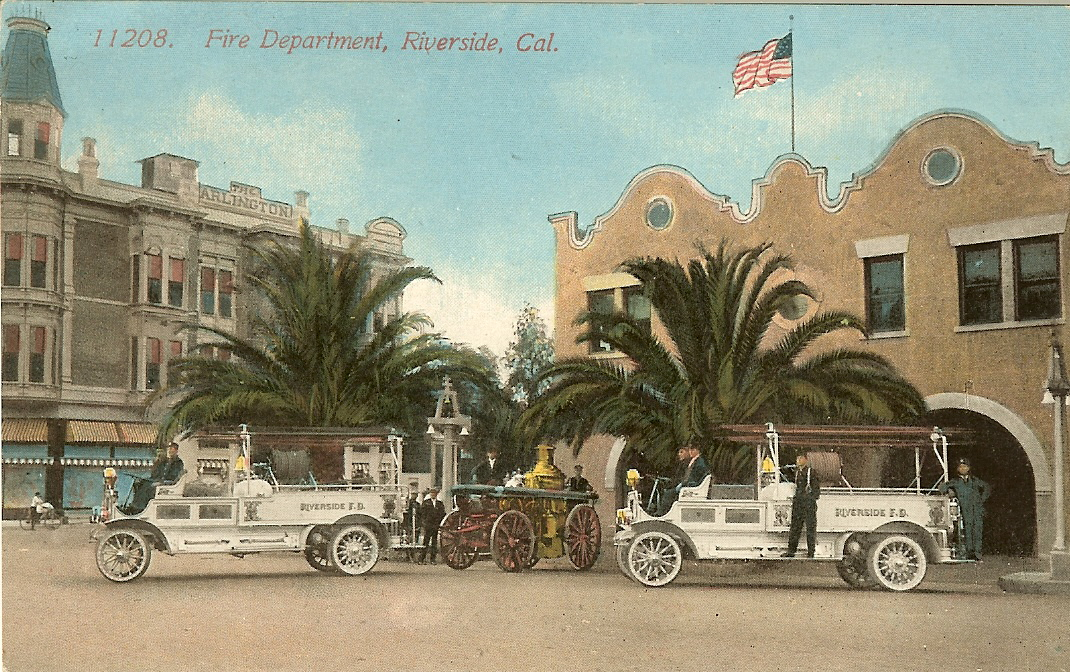
Riverside, 1910

Three trees were planted on the Tibbets' property. The trees thrived in the southern California climate and the navel orange industry grew rapidly. The establishment of the citrus industry is commemorated in the landscapes and exhibits of the California Citrus State Historic Park and the restored packing houses in the downtown's Marketplace district. By 1882, there were more than half a million citrus trees in California, almost half of which were in Riverside. The development of refrigerated railroad cars and innovative irrigation systems established Riverside as the richest city in the United States (in terms of income per capita) by 1895.

== Geography ==
Riverside is the 59th-most populous city in the United States, the 12th-most populous city in California, and the largest city in California's Inland Empire metro area. According to the United States Census Bureau, the city has an area of 81.4 square miles (210.8 km^{2}), of which 81.1 square miles (210 km^{2}) is land and 0.3 square miles (0.78 km^{2}) (0.37%) is water. The elevation of downtown Riverside is 860 feet (260 m). Hills within the city limits include Mount Rubidoux, a city landmark and tourist attraction. Riverside is surrounded by small and large mountains, some of which get a dusting of winter snow. Many residents also enjoy the many beaches of Southern California. Riverside is about a 47-mile (76 km) drive to the Pacific Ocean and is close to Orange County and Los Angeles County.

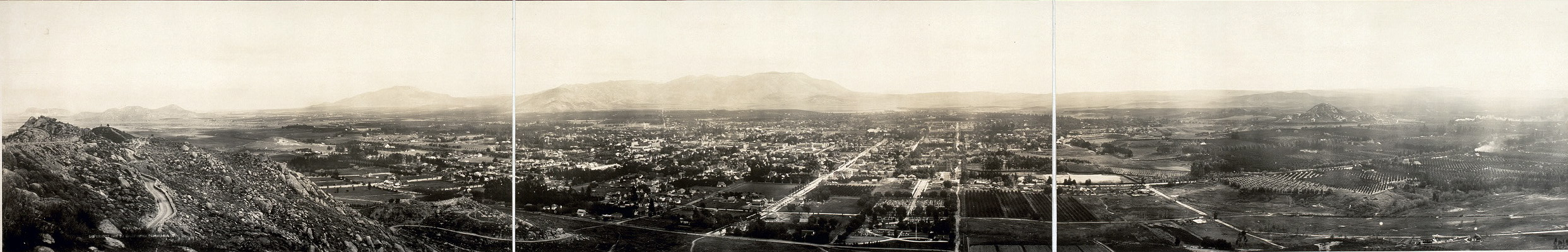
A panorama of Riverside, California, taken from the summit of Mount Rubidoux, 1908

=== Cityscape ===
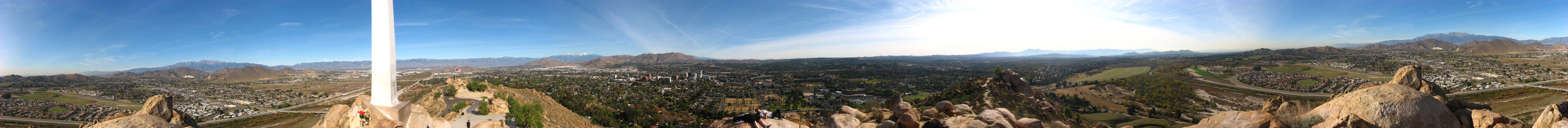
A 360-degree panorama of Riverside, California, taken from the summit of Mount Rubidoux

=== Landmarks ===
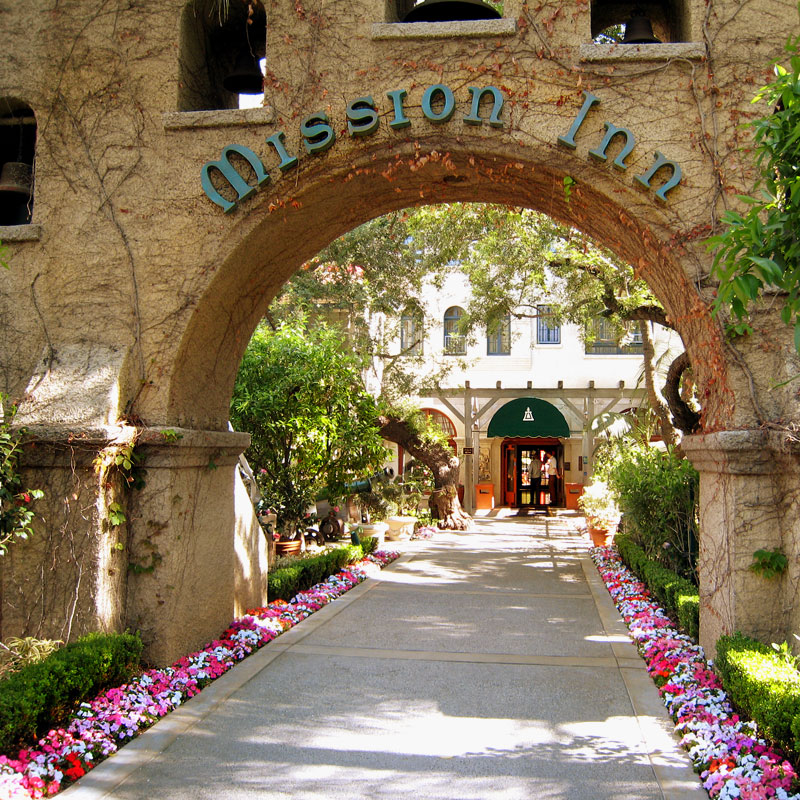
The Mission Inn

Riverside is home to the historic Mission Inn, the Beaux-Arts style Riverside County Historic Courthouse (based on the Petit Palais in Paris, France), and the Riverside Fox Theater, where the first showing of the 1939 film Gone with the Wind took place. The theater was purchased by the city and refurbished as part of the Riverside Renaissance Initiative. The Fox Theater underwent extensive renovation and restoration, which was completed in 2009, to turn the old cinema into a performing arts theater. The building was expanded to hold 1,600 seats and the stage was enlarged to accommodate Broadway-style performances. In January 2010, singer Sheryl Crow opened the newly remodeled Fox Theater in a nearly sold-out show.

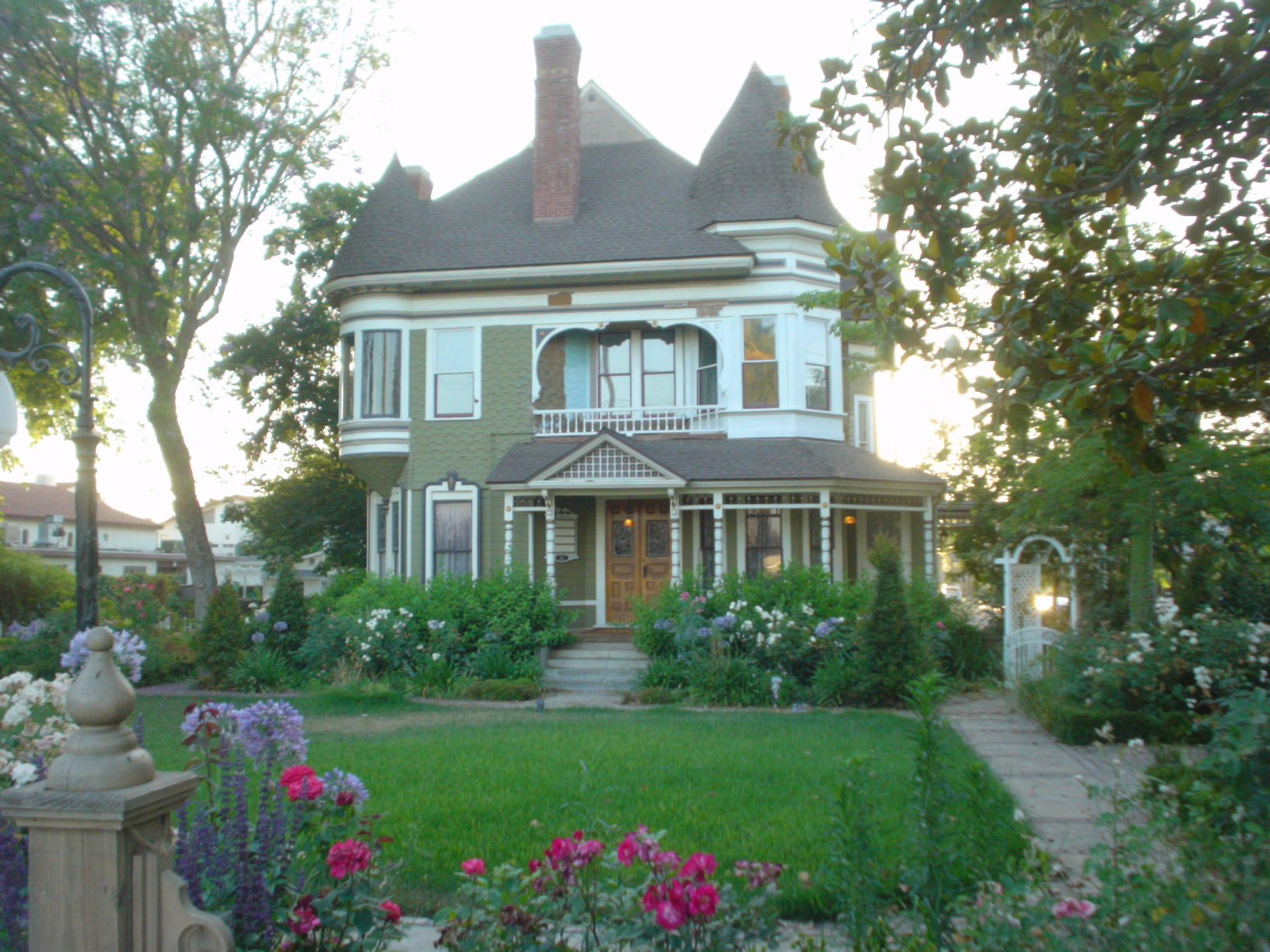
One of the remaining Queen Anne-style houses from the 19th century

Riverside is the home of the "World's Largest Paper Cup" (actually made of concrete), which is over three stories (68.10 ft; 20.76 m ) tall. The "Dixie Cup" landmark is on Iowa Street just north of Palmyrita, in front of what was once the Dixie Corporation's manufacturing plant (now closed down).

The Peace Tower on Mount Rubidoux

Notable hills in Riverside's scenic landscape include Box Springs Mountain and Evans (Jurupa) Hill which are preserved open spaces. South of Riverside is Lake Mathews. There is also the well-known landmark/foothill Mount Rubidoux, which is next to the Santa Ana River and one of the most noticeable landmarks in the downtown area. This foothill is the dividing line between the town of Rubidoux and the city of Riverside.

March Joint Air Reserve Base borders Riverside on the east serving as a divider between the city and Moreno Valley. March ARB, founded in 1918, is the oldest operating Air Force base west of the Mississippi River.

At the entrance to Riverside from the 60 freeway sits Fairmount Park. This extensive urban oasis was designed by the firm founded by Frederick Law Olmsted, which had designed New York's Central Park. It includes a stocked pond that is home to many species of birds. On nearby private land is the former site of Spring Rancheria, a Cahuilla village.

=== Neighborhoods ===
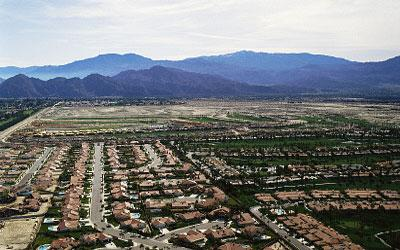
Homes in Riverside

The city of Riverside has 28 designated "neighborhoods" within the city limits. These include Airport, Alessandro Heights, Arlanza, Arlington, Arlington Heights, Arlington South, Canyon Crest, Casa Blanca, Downtown, Eastside, Grand, Hawarden Hills, Hillside Hunter Industrial Park, La Sierra, La Sierra Acres, La Sierra Hills, La Sierra South, Magnolia Center, Mission Grove, Northside, Orangecrest, Presidential Park, Ramona, Sycamore Canyon Park, Sycamore Canyon Springs, University, Victoria and Wood Streets.

East of downtown is the originally named "Eastside". which grew out of a colonia inhabited by Mexican immigrant workers in the orange groves, other orchards and produce fields. The area these people lived in was originally a settlement called La Placita that predated the city, being founded in 1843. Mexican communities were also formed in the barrio of Casa Blanca during the early 20th century.

=== Features ===
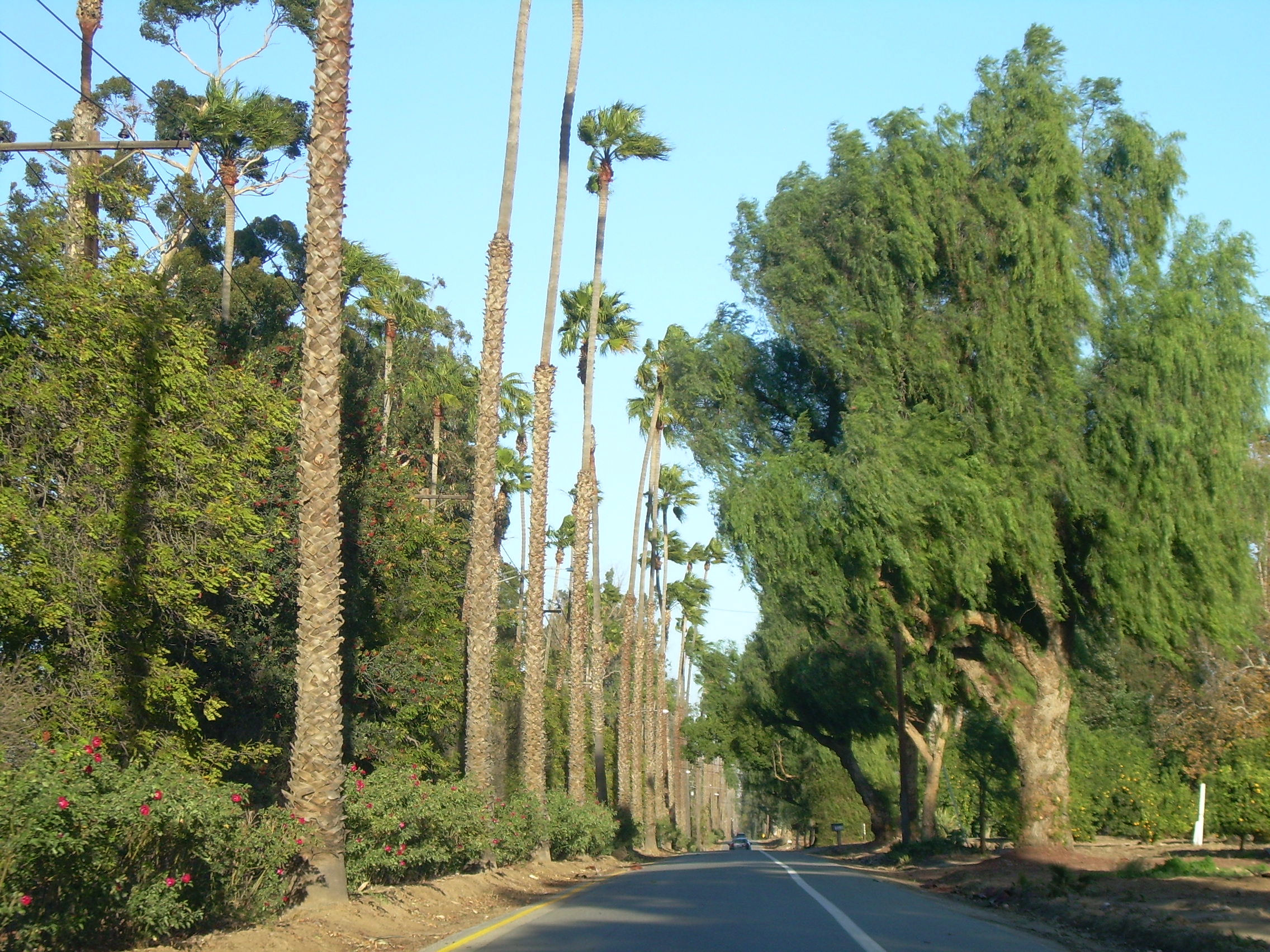
Victoria Avenue is an important citrus-lined paseo.

Riverside is home to the University of California, Riverside. The UCR Botanical Gardens contains 40 acres (16 ha) of unusual plants, with four miles (6.4 km) of walking trails.

Another notable university in the city is La Sierra University, whose 150-acre (61 ha) campus is located in Riverside's La Sierra neighborhood. The university is home to the World Museum of Natural History, which showcases systematic displays of amphibians, birds, mammals, and reptiles. The specimens are presented through sculpture and freeze-dry taxidermy exhibits.

The city prides itself on its historic connection to the navel orange, which was introduced to North America from Brazil in 1874. Riverside is home to the one surviving Parent Navel Orange Tree, from which all American West Coast navel orange trees are descended.

There are three hospitals in Riverside.

- Riverside Community Hospital is a General Acute Care Hospital with Basic Emergency Services and a Level I Trauma Center as of 2020.
- Parkview Community Hospital Medical Center is a General Acute Care Hospital with Basic Emergency Services as of 2006.
- Kaiser Foundation Hospital – Riverside is a General Acute Care Hospital with Basic Emergency Services as of 2006.

Riverside is also home to the Riverside Public Library system. Branches include: Arlanza, Arlington, La Sierra, Marcy, Main, Orange Terrace, Eastside Cybrary, and Casa Blanca.

Convention facilities are available at several locations. The Riverside Convention Center, remodeled in 2014, offers 66,000 sq ft (6,100 m^{2}) indoors and 14,000 sq ft (1,300 m^{2}) of outdoor space. Also available is the Riverside Marriott with 14,000 sq ft (1,300 m^{2}) indoors, and the Mission Inn with 15,000 sq ft (1,400 m^{2}) indoors and 5,000 sq ft (460 m^{2}) outdoors. All three facilities are located within walking distance of one another in downtown Riverside. Meetings with an academic focus are also held at the University of California, Riverside.

=== Cemeteries ===
Cemeteries in Riverside include:

- Crestlawn Memorial Park; notable burials include Medal of Honor recipient George Alan Ingalls, Cheri Jo Bates, baseball player Mike Darr, actor Roland Harrah III, and actor Darwood Kaye.
- Evergreen Cemetery; notable burials include Marcella Craft, Frank Augustus Miller, John W. North, Eliza Tibbets, and Al Wilson.
- Olivewood Memorial Park; notable burials include Medal of Honor recipient Jesus S. Duran, Travis Alexander, Dorothy Burgess, Mayor Ben H. Lewis, Del Lord, Gloria Ramirez, and Eric Show.
- Riverside National Cemetery, established in 1976, is the largest cemetery managed by the National Cemetery Administration, and since 2000 has been the most active in the system based on the number of interments.
- Sherman Indian High School Cemetery, Home Gardens

=== Climate ===
Riverside experiences a semi-arid climate (Köppen climate classification BSh) bordering on an arid climate (Köppen climate classification BWh) with hot, dry summers and mild, relatively wet winters. Normal monthly mean temperatures range from 54.8 °F (12.7 °C) in December to 79.8 °F (26.6 °C) in August. On average, temperatures reach the freezing mark and 100 °F (37.8 °C) on 3.5 and 21.6 days annually, respectively. Record temperatures range from 18 °F (−7.8 °C) on January 15, 1911, up to 118 °F (47.8 °C) on July 17, 1925, June 16, 1917, and July 6, 2018. On average, Riverside receives 9.39 in (239 mm) of precipitation annually, with measurable precipitation occurring on 35 days, with almost all of it between November and April, with February the wettest month. The wettest "rain year" was from July 1940 to June 1941 with 22.72 inches or 577.1 millimetres and the driest from July 1960 to June 1961 with only 2.79 inches or 70.9 millimetres. Due to the dry climate and typical lack of rain, FEMA ranks Riverside County as one of the highest-risk areas for wildfires in California, giving it a maximum risk score of 100%.

Climate data for Riverside, California (Riverside Municipal Airport) (1991–2020 normals, extremes 1893–present)
| Month | Jan | Feb | Mar | Apr | May | Jun | Jul | Aug | Sep | Oct | Nov | Dec | Year |
|---|---|---|---|---|---|---|---|---|---|---|---|---|---|
| Record high °F (°C) | 94 (34) | 94 (34) | 102 (39) | 105 (41) | 110 (43) | 118 (48) | 118 (48) | 113 (45) | 117 (47) | 109 (43) | 100 (38) | 94 (34) | 118 (48) |
| Mean maximum °F (°C) | 83.1 (28.4) | 83.3 (28.5) | 87.8 (31.0) | 94.2 (34.6) | 97.1 (36.2) | 101.3 (38.5) | 105.1 (40.6) | 106.6 (41.4) | 106.2 (41.2) | 99.8 (37.7) | 91.0 (32.8) | 82.6 (28.1) | 109.6 (43.1) |
| Mean daily maximum °F (°C) | 67.7 (19.8) | 67.9 (19.9) | 72.1 (22.3) | 75.9 (24.4) | 79.9 (26.6) | 86.7 (30.4) | 93.3 (34.1) | 94.9 (34.9) | 91.3 (32.9) | 82.7 (28.2) | 74.5 (23.6) | 66.8 (19.3) | 79.5 (26.4) |
| Daily mean °F (°C) | 55.6 (13.1) | 56.3 (13.5) | 59.5 (15.3) | 62.9 (17.2) | 67.6 (19.8) | 73.0 (22.8) | 78.6 (25.9) | 79.8 (26.6) | 76.6 (24.8) | 68.9 (20.5) | 61.0 (16.1) | 54.8 (12.7) | 66.2 (19.0) |
| Mean daily minimum °F (°C) | 43.6 (6.4) | 44.7 (7.1) | 46.9 (8.3) | 50.0 (10.0) | 55.3 (12.9) | 59.3 (15.2) | 63.9 (17.7) | 64.7 (18.2) | 61.9 (16.6) | 55.2 (12.9) | 47.4 (8.6) | 42.8 (6.0) | 53.0 (11.7) |
| Mean minimum °F (°C) | 34.0 (1.1) | 36.0 (2.2) | 38.8 (3.8) | 42.3 (5.7) | 48.3 (9.1) | 53.8 (12.1) | 58.6 (14.8) | 59.0 (15.0) | 54.5 (12.5) | 46.7 (8.2) | 38.0 (3.3) | 33.2 (0.7) | 31.5 (−0.3) |
| Record low °F (°C) | 18 (−8) | 24 (−4) | 25 (−4) | 29 (−2) | 33 (1) | 35 (2) | 41 (5) | 40 (4) | 37 (3) | 30 (−1) | 23 (−5) | 21 (−6) | 18 (−8) |
| Average precipitation inches (mm) | 2.29 (58) | 2.41 (61) | 1.21 (31) | 0.57 (14) | 0.20 (5.1) | 0.04 (1.0) | 0.12 (3.0) | 0.03 (0.76) | 0.11 (2.8) | 0.33 (8.4) | 0.57 (14) | 1.51 (38) | 9.39 (239) |
| Average precipitation days (≥ 0.01 in) | 4.8 | 6.9 | 5.2 | 3.9 | 1.6 | 0.2 | 0.7 | 0.5 | 0.5 | 2.3 | 3.6 | 5.1 | 35.3 |
Source 1: NWS
Source 2: NOAA

=== Environment ===
The Riverside area faces issues of smog and above-average levels of air pollution. Southern California is the only extreme nonattainment area for ozone and is one of only three severe nonattainment areas for particulate matter. In a comparison by the National Campaign Against Dirty Air Power (2003), the Riverside-San Bernardino-Ontario area was found to be one of the most polluted regions based on year-round particle measurements when compared to other U.S. cities. The city made efforts to reduce pollution by incorporating additional means of mass transit (Metrolink) and equipping its entire fleet of buses with natural gas. Smog decreased considerably over the next few years as local municipalities and counties worked with the South Coast Air Quality Management District to implement measures to improve regional air quality. In 2020, the American Lung Association rated Riverside County one of the nation's worst counties for smog. Most of Riverside's smog problems are the result of the prevailing wind patterns that blow the smog from the Los Angeles Basin and particulates generated by southern California's multitude of vehicles, and the Port of Los Angeles and Port of Long Beach into the Inland Empire.

== Demographics ==
Historical population
| Census | Pop. | Note | %± |
|---|---|---|---|
| 1890 | 4,683 | | — |
| 1900 | 7,973 | | 70.3% |
| 1910 | 15,212 | | 90.8% |
| 1920 | 19,341 | | 27.1% |
| 1930 | 29,696 | | 53.5% |
| 1940 | 34,696 | | 16.8% |
| 1950 | 46,764 | | 34.8% |
| 1960 | 84,332 | | 80.3% |
| 1970 | 140,089 | | 66.1% |
| 1980 | 170,591 | | 21.8% |
| 1990 | 226,505 | | 32.8% |
| 2000 | 255,166 | | 12.7% |
| 2010 | 303,871 | | 19.1% |
| 2020 | 314,998 | | 3.7% |
| 2025 (est.) | 323,057 | ▲ | 2.6% |
U.S. Decennial Census

=== Racial and ethnic composition ===
| Historical racial profile | 2010 | 2000 | 1990 | 1970 |
|---|---|---|---|---|
| White | 56.5% | 59.3% | 70.8% | 93.1% |
| —Non-Hispanic | 34.0% | 46.6% | 61.3% | 82.1% |
| Black or African American | 7.0% | 7.4% | 7.4% | 5.2% |
| Hispanic or Latino (of any race) | 49.0% | 38.1% | 26.0% | 11.4% |
| Asian | 7.4% | 5.7% | 5.2% | 0.7% |

Riverside city, California – Racial and ethnic composition Note: the US Census treats Hispanic/Latino as an ethnic category. This table excludes Latinos from the racial categories and assigns them to a separate category. Hispanics/Latinos may be of any race.
| Race / Ethnicity (NH = Non-Hispanic) | Pop 1980 | Pop 1990 | Pop 2000 | Pop 2010 | Pop 2020 | % 1980 | % 1990 | % 2000 | % 2010 | % 2020 |
|---|---|---|---|---|---|---|---|---|---|---|
| White alone (NH) | 126,199 | 138,746 | 116,254 | 103,398 | 87,213 | 73.85% | 61.26% | 45.56% | 34.03% | 27.69% |
| Black or African American alone (NH) | 11,609 | 15,896 | 18,051 | 19,917 | 18,832 | 6.79% | 7.02% | 7.07% | 6.55% | 5.98% |
| Native American or Alaska Native alone (NH) | 1,863 | 1,405 | 1,415 | 1,297 | 1,195 | 1.09% | 0.62% | 0.55% | 0.43% | 0.38% |
| Asian alone (NH) | 3,294 | 11,120 | 14,233 | 21,934 | 22,450 | 1.93% | 4.91% | 5.58% | 7.22% | 7.13% |
| Native Hawaiian or Pacific Islander alone (NH) | 3,294 | 11,120 | 848 | 1,019 | 951 | 1.93% | 4.91% | 0.33% | 0.34% | 0.30% |
| Other race alone (NH) | 404 | 512 | 492 | 617 | 1,704 | 0.24% | 0.23% | 0.19% | 0.20% | 0.54% |
| Mixed race or Multiracial (NH) | x | x | 6,558 | 6,736 | 10,267 | x | x | 2.57% | 2.22% | 3.26% |
| Hispanic or Latino (any race) | 27,507 | 58,826 | 97,315 | 148,953 | 172,386 | 16.10% | 25.97% | 38.14% | 49.02% | 54.73% |
| Total | 170,876 | 226,505 | 255,166 | 303,871 | 314,998 | 100.00% | 100.00% | 100.00% | 100.00% | 100.00% |

=== 2020 ===
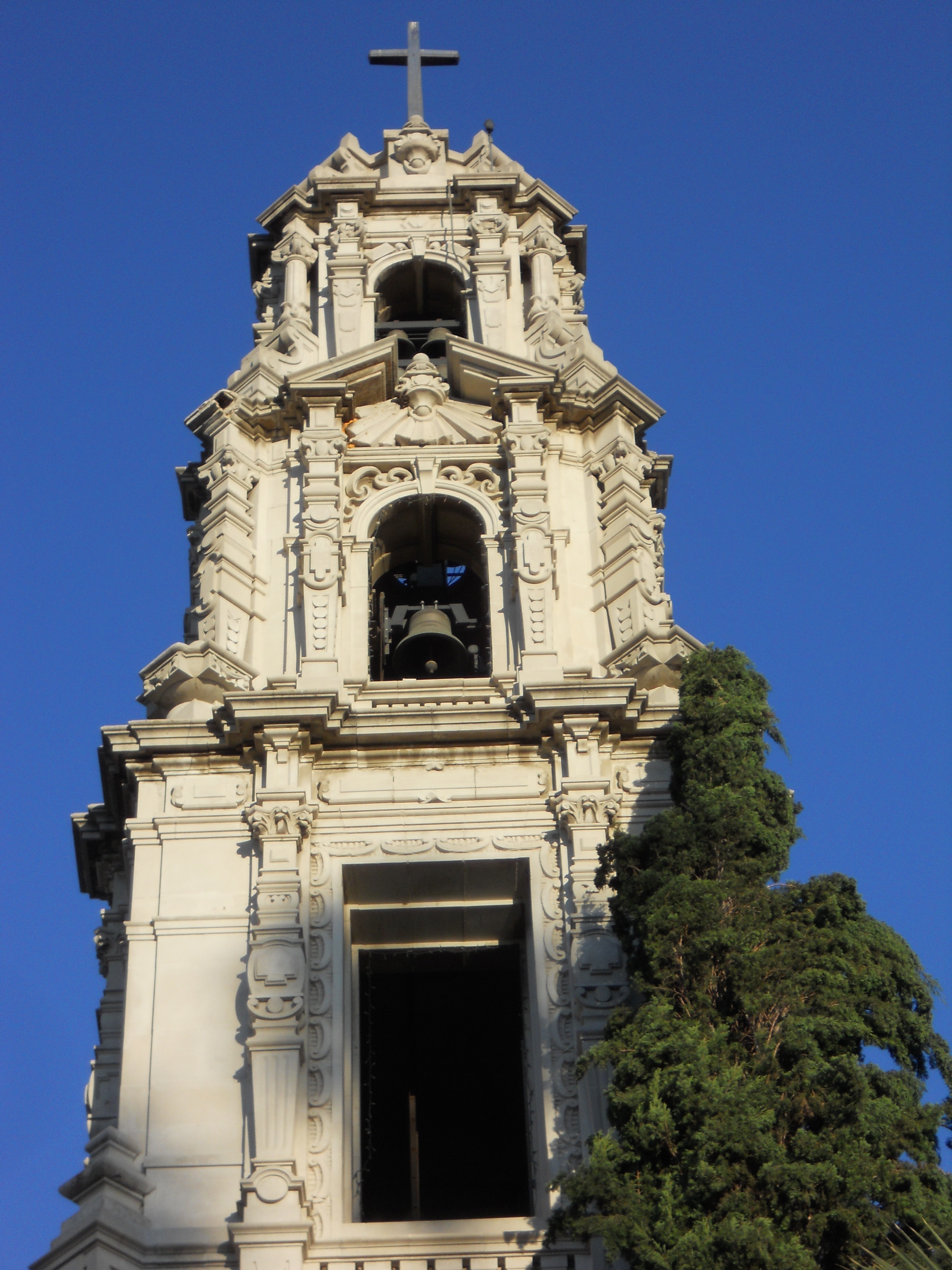
First Congregational Church of Riverside

The 2020 United States census reported that Riverside had a population of 314,998. The population density was 3,877.8 inhabitants per square mile (1,497.2/km^{2}). The racial makeup of Riverside was 36.5% White, 6.4% African American, 2.0% Native American, 7.4% Asian, 0.4% Pacific Islander, 30.3% from other races, and 17.2% from two or more races. Hispanic or Latino of any race were 54.7% of the population.

The census reported that 96.3% of the population lived in households, 3.0% lived in non-institutionalized group quarters, and 0.6% were institutionalized.

There were 96,270 households, out of which 38.1% included children under the age of 18, 47.9% were married-couple households, 7.5% were cohabiting couple households, 26.7% had a female householder with no partner present, and 17.8% had a male householder with no partner present. 19.9% of households were one person, and 7.8% were one person aged 65 or older. The average household size was 3.15. There were 69,909 families (72.6% of all households).

The age distribution was 23.3% under the age of 18, 13.4% aged 18 to 24, 28.2% aged 25 to 44, 23.0% aged 45 to 64, and 12.0% who were 65 years of age or older. The median age was 33.3 years. For every 100 females, there were 96.5 males.

There were 100,255 housing units at an average density of 1,234.2 units per square mile (476.5 units/km^{2}), of which 96,270 (96.0%) were occupied. Of these, 54.2% were owner-occupied, and 45.8% were occupied by renters.

In 2023, the US Census Bureau estimated that the median household income was $88,575, and the per capita income was $33,716. About 9.1% of families and 12.5% of the population were below the poverty line.

=== 2010 ===
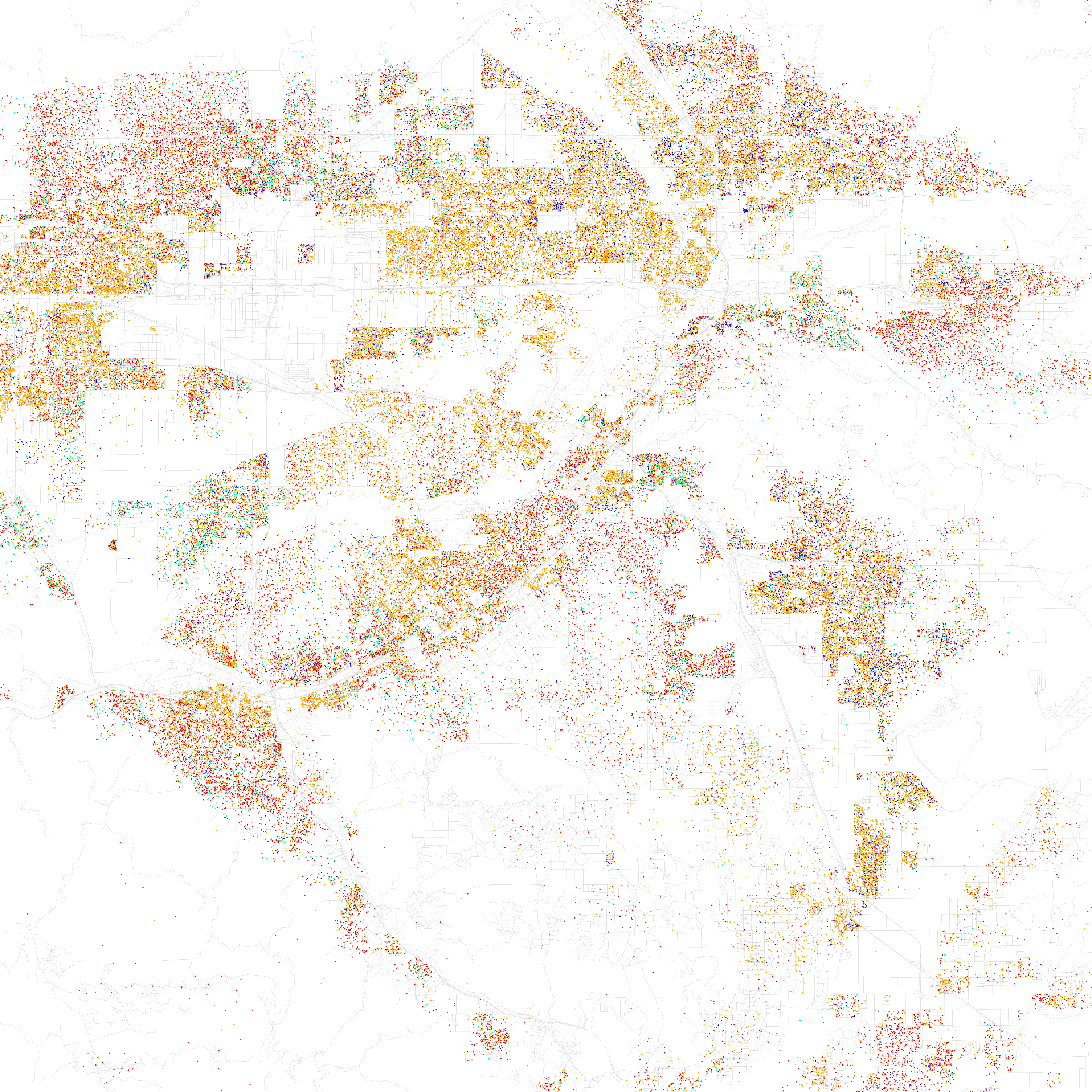
Map of racial distribution in Riverside, 2010 U.S. Census. Each dot is 25 people: ⬤ White ⬤ Black ⬤ Asian ⬤ Hispanic ⬤ Other

The 2010 census reported that Riverside had a population of 303,871. The population density was 3,731.0 inhabitants per square mile (1,440.5/km^{2}). The racial makeup of Riverside was

- 171,669 (56.5%) White,
- 21,421 (7.0%) African American,
- 3,467 (1.1%) Native American,
- 22,566 (7.4%) Asian (1.7% Filipino, 1.6% Chinese, 1.1% Korean, 1.0% Vietnamese, 1.0% Indonesian, 0.1% Japanese, 0.1% Pakistani),
- 1,219 (0.4%) Pacific Islander,
- 68,111 (22.4%) from other races, and 15,418 (5.1%) from two or more races.
- 148,953 Hispanic or Latino residents, of any race (49.0%);

41.8% of Riverside's population was of Mexican descent, 1.1% Guatemalan, 1.0% Salvadoran, 0.7% Puerto Rican, 0.3% Cuban, 0.2% Nicaraguan, and 0.2% Colombian origin. Non-Hispanic Whites were 34.0% of the population in 2010, down from 82.1% in 1970.

The Census reported that 292,322 people (96.2% of the population) lived in households, 8,925 (2.9%) lived in non-institutionalized group quarters, and 2,624 (0.9%) were institutionalized.

There were 91,932 households, out of which 38,939 (42.4%) had children under the age of 18 living in them, 45,398 (49.4%) were opposite-sex married couples living together, 13,845 (15.1%) had a female householder with no husband present, 6,372 (6.9%) had a male householder with no wife present. There were 6,392 (7.0%) unmarried opposite-sex partnerships, and 746 (0.8%) same-sex married couples or partnerships. 18,284 households (19.9%) were made up of individuals, and 6,262 (6.8%) had someone living alone who was 65 years of age or older. The average household size was 3.18. There were 65,615 families (71.4% of all households); the average family size was 3.67.

There were 81,406 people (26.8%) under the age of 18, 47,126 (15.5%) aged 18 to 24, 82,482 (27.1%) aged 25 to 44, 66,615 (21.9%) aged 45 to 64, and 26,242 (8.6%) who were 65 years of age or older. The median age was 30.0 years. For every 100 females, there were 97.6 males. For every 100 females age 18 and over, there were 95.4 males.

There were 98,444 housing units at an average density of 1,208.7 units per square mile (466.7 units/km^{2}), of which 51,185 (55.7%) were owner-occupied, and 40,747 (44.3%) were occupied by renters. The homeowner vacancy rate was 2.4%; the rental vacancy rate was 7.4%. 168,888 people (55.6% of the population) lived in owner-occupied housing units and 123,434 people (40.6%) lived in rental housing units.

According to the 2010 United States Census, Riverside had a median household income of $56,403, with 17.5% of the population living below the federal poverty line.

=== Religion ===
Religion in Riverside (2014)
1. Protestantism (43.0%)
2. Roman Catholicism (22.0%)
3. LDS Church (3.00%)
4. Eastern Orthodoxy (1.00%)
5. Jehovah's Witnesses (2.00%)
6. No religion (25.0%)
7. Other religion (4.00%)

Riverside is largely Christian and is home to Catholic, Eastern Orthodox, Church of Jesus Christ of Latter Day Saints, Protestant, and Universalist Unitarian churches, an Islamic mosque, Jewish synagogue, Hindu temple, and several Buddhist temples. Riverside is also home to the Inland Empire Atheists and Agnostics organization.

The city has a large population of Seventh-day Adventists, due to the presence of La Sierra University and proximity to Loma Linda near San Bernardino.

There is also a large Mormon population, as well as in the San Bernardino area, as the Church of Jesus Christ of Latter-day Saints has missions in Riverside and Redlands near their temple.

Several religious celebrations take place on top of the city's Mount Rubidoux. One is an annual Easter Sunrise service, which is the nation's oldest continual non-denominational outdoor Easter service The 100th anniversary of the event was held April 12, 2009. Each December, a 2½-mile (4 km) procession from Our Lady of Guadalupe Shrine to the top of Mount Rubidoux promotes awareness of Juan Diego's walk up Tepeyac hill, in 1531, where he reportedly saw a Marian apparition known as Our Lady of Guadalupe.

In 2012, a controversy erupted regarding the cross atop Mount Rubidoux, which was on city-owned land and maintained by the city. Due to constitutional issues regarding separation of church and state, the Riverside City Council sold the cross and the land under it (0.43 acres; 1740.15 sq m) to a private entity for $10,500.

== Economy ==
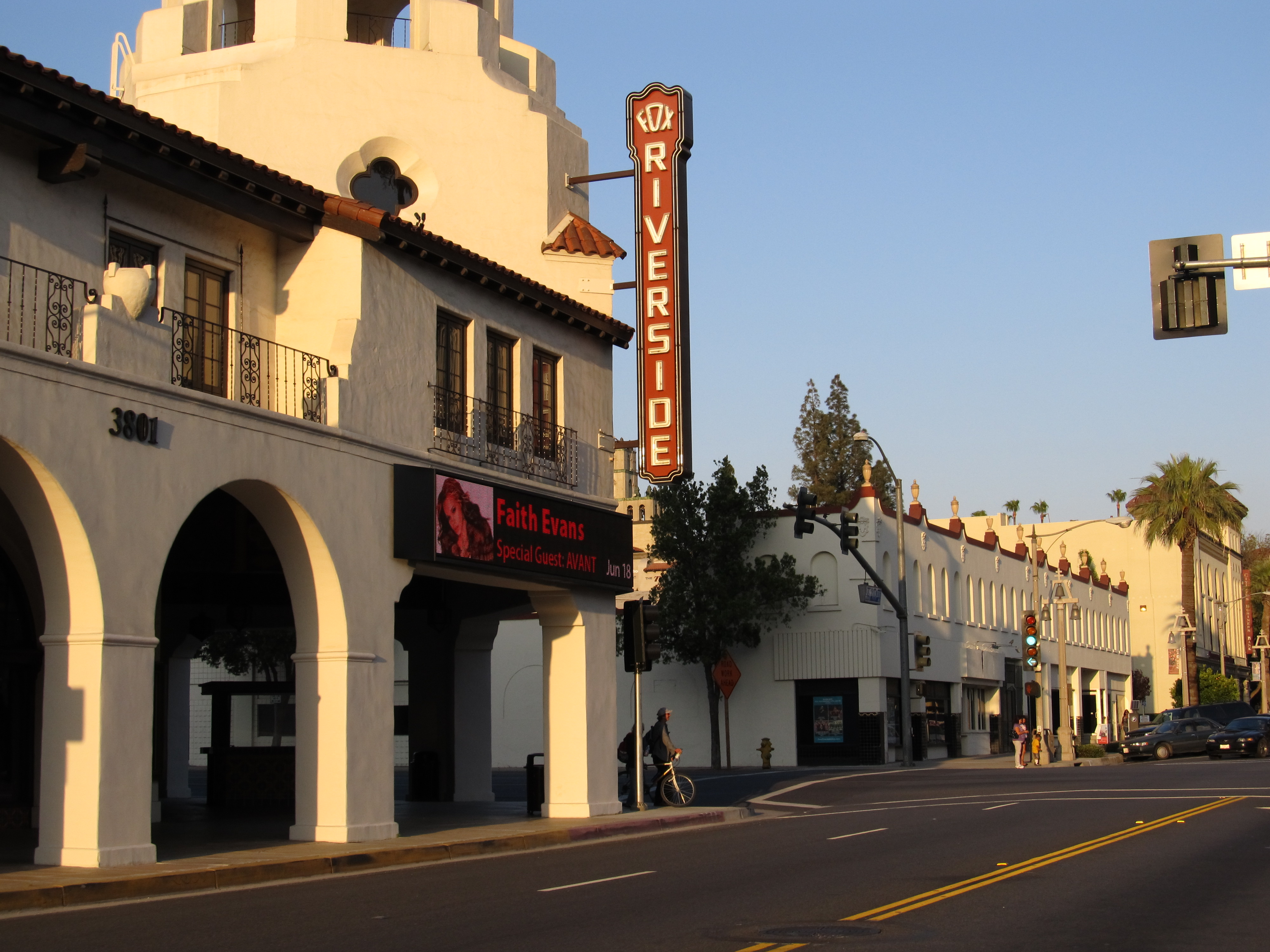
Downtown Riverside

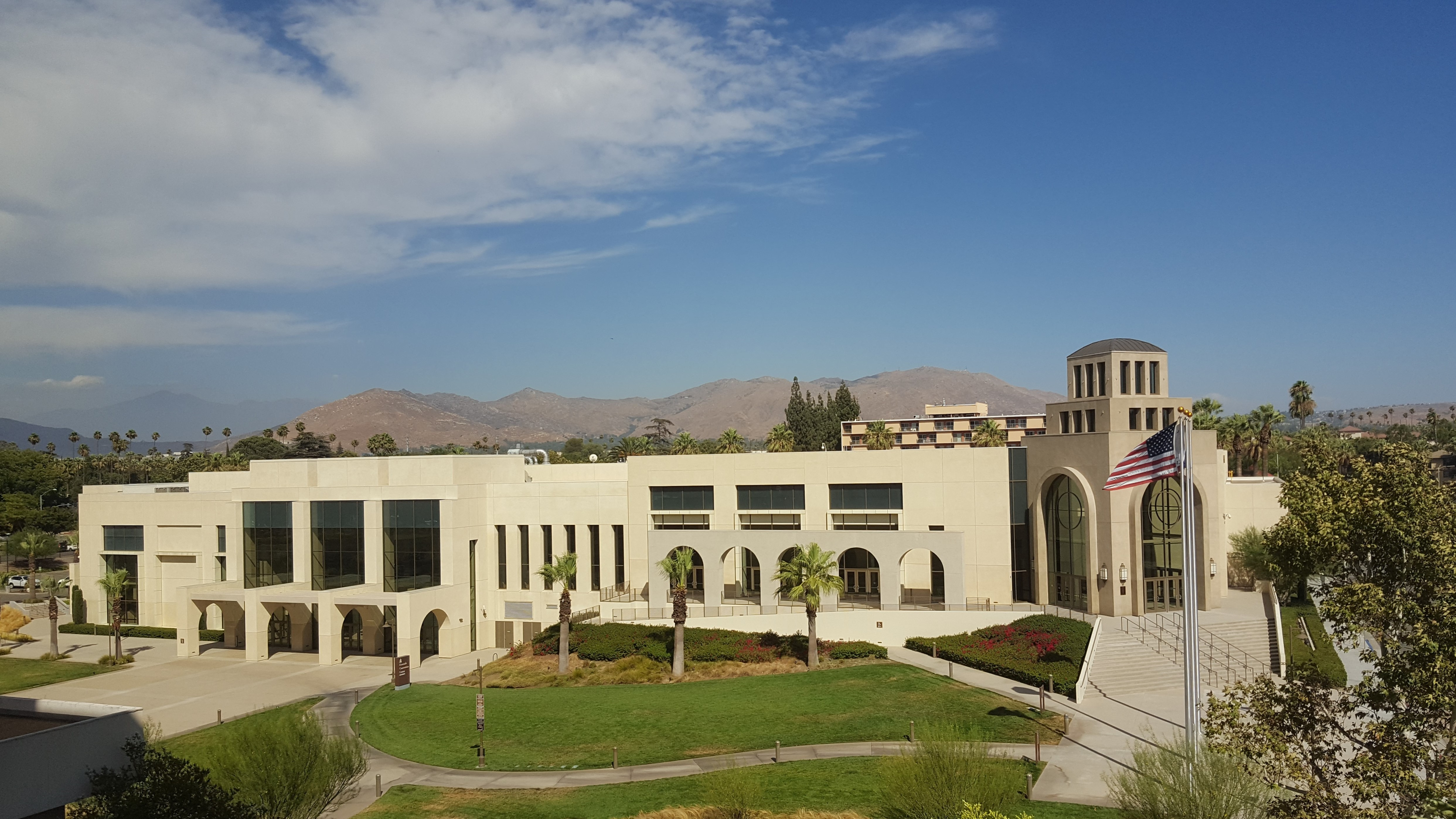
Riverside Convention Center

Riverside's economy consists largely of light-industry and generates a range of products including aircraft components, automotive parts, gas cylinders, electronic equipment, food products, and medical devices. Supporting the manufacturing sector are several industrial parks, including those in the Hunter Industrial Park, Sycamore Canyon Industrial Park and Airport Industrial Areas. As the county seat of Riverside County and the most populous city in the Inland Empire, Riverside also houses several legal, accounting, engineering, and banking firms. Citrus production and packing houses still exist within the city, but the industry is in decline.

American electronics company Bourns is among the companies based in Riverside.

Citrus is in decline in many areas of the Inland Empire where urbanization and water scarcity have made the industry uneconomic.

Top employers

According to the city's 2023 Comprehensive Annual Financial Report, the top employers in the city are:

| # | Employer | # of employees |
|---|---|---|
| 1 | County of Riverside | 24,399 |
| 2 | March Air Force Reserve | 9,750 |
| 3 | University of California, Riverside | 8,831 |
| 4 | Kaiser Permanente | 7,610 |
| 5 | Riverside Unified School District | 4,505 |
| 6 | Riverside Community Hospital | 2,993 |
| 7 | City of Riverside | 2,457 |
| 8 | Riverside Community College District | 1,900 |
| 9 | Alvord Unified School District | 1,824 |
| 10 | California Baptist University | 1,355 |

=== Retail ===
Retail shopping centers include the open-air Riverside Plaza, and the Galleria at Tyler mall. The Main Street Pedestrian Mall in downtown is the site of several unique shops.

== Arts and culture ==
=== Museums ===
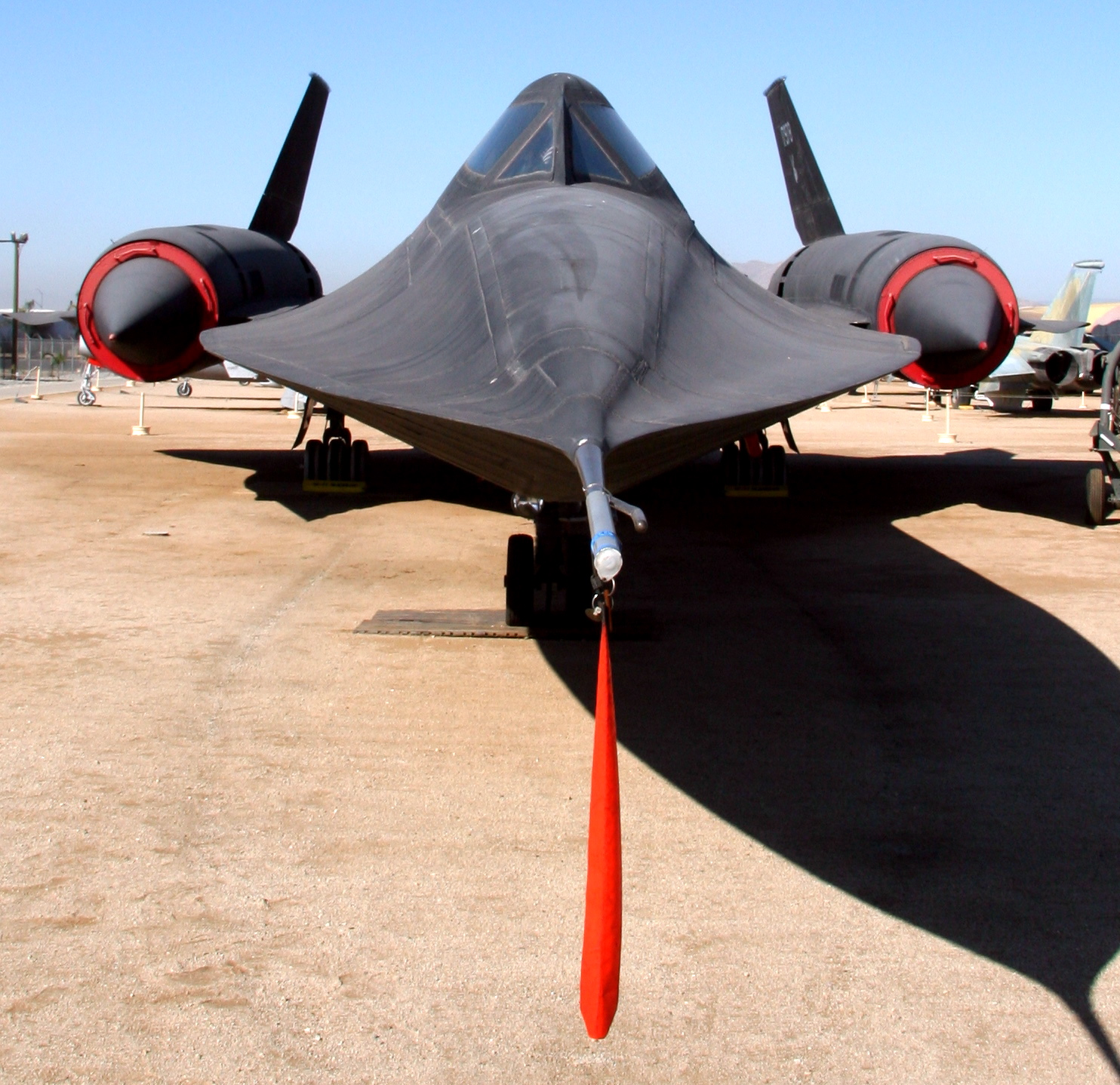
Lockheed SR-71 Blackbird at the March Field Air Museum

- California Citrus State Historic Park Museum
- The Cheech Marin Center for Chicano Art, Culture & Industry
- Entomology Research Museum at the University of California, Riverside (not open to the public).
- March Field Air Museum
- Mission Inn Museum
- Riverside Art Museum
- Museum of Riverside
- Sherman Indian Museum at the Sherman Indian High School
- Sweeney Art Gallery, an extension of the University of California, Riverside
- The Stahl Center Museum of Culture at the La Sierra University
- University of California, Riverside California Museum of Photography
- World Museum of Natural History at the La Sierra University

=== Festivals and events ===
Several festivals occur throughout the year in Riverside, many focused on the downtown area.

Each year in February The Riverside Dickens Festival is held to "enhance a sense of community among citizens of Riverside County and Southern California by creating a series of literary events and to provide educational, family-oriented, literary entertainment and activities such as plays, musical performances, pageants, living history presentations, workshops, lectures, classroom study, exhibits and a street bazaar with free entertainment, vendors and costumed characters."

The Riverside Airshow takes place in March at the Riverside Municipal Airport. The event attracts around 70,000 people and includes aerial performers, over 200 acres (0.81 km^{2}) of aircraft displays, a car show and military vehicle display, children's activities, food and refreshments, helicopter displays and community group exhibits.

The March Field Airfest, also known as Thunder Over the Empire, is a biennial air show held at March Air Reserve Base. The air show is among the largest events in the Inland Empire and Riverside County. The show has featured such performers as the United States Air Force Thunderbirds, the Air Combat Command demonstrations teams and many other military and civilian demonstrations. 2010 saw the Patriots Jet Team as the highlight demonstration team of the show. Attendance for the 2010 show was estimated at over 150,000.

The Riverside International Film Festival (RIFF) takes place in April and features films from around the world. Sponsored by the city of Riverside, local universities, and many businesses, past festivals have featured over 175 films.

Old Riverside Foundation, a local nonprofit focused on historic preservation of the built environment, hosts an annual Vintage Home Tour in May that showcases private historic homes, open to the public for one day only.

In October, the California Riverside Ballet sponsors the Ghost Walk, which in 2013 celebrated its 22nd year. The event is a walk around some of the city's oldest and most historic buildings, with volunteers leading tours and telling ghost stories.

The Riverside Festival of Lights centers around The Mission Inn Hotel & Spa, located downtown. Decoration of the Inn begins in October and a lighting ceremony that includes speakers, fireworks, and live musicians takes place the day after Thanksgiving Day. Carolers, horse-drawn carriage rides, and ice skating all color the festival. Restaurants, cafes, and community groups all contribute to the festival. The festival runs through New Year's Day.

Also during the week of Thanksgiving, the Festival of Trees is held at the Riverside Convention Center. Held since 1990, the event seeks to raise money for the Riverside County Regional Medical Center children's units including the Neonatal Intensive Care Unit, the Child Abuse and Neglect Unit, and the Pediatric Intensive Care Unit. Attracting 25,000 people per year, the event has raised over $5 million since its inception. At the Festival of Trees, many professionally decorated Christmas trees are judged, auctioned, and then displayed for public viewing.

== Government ==
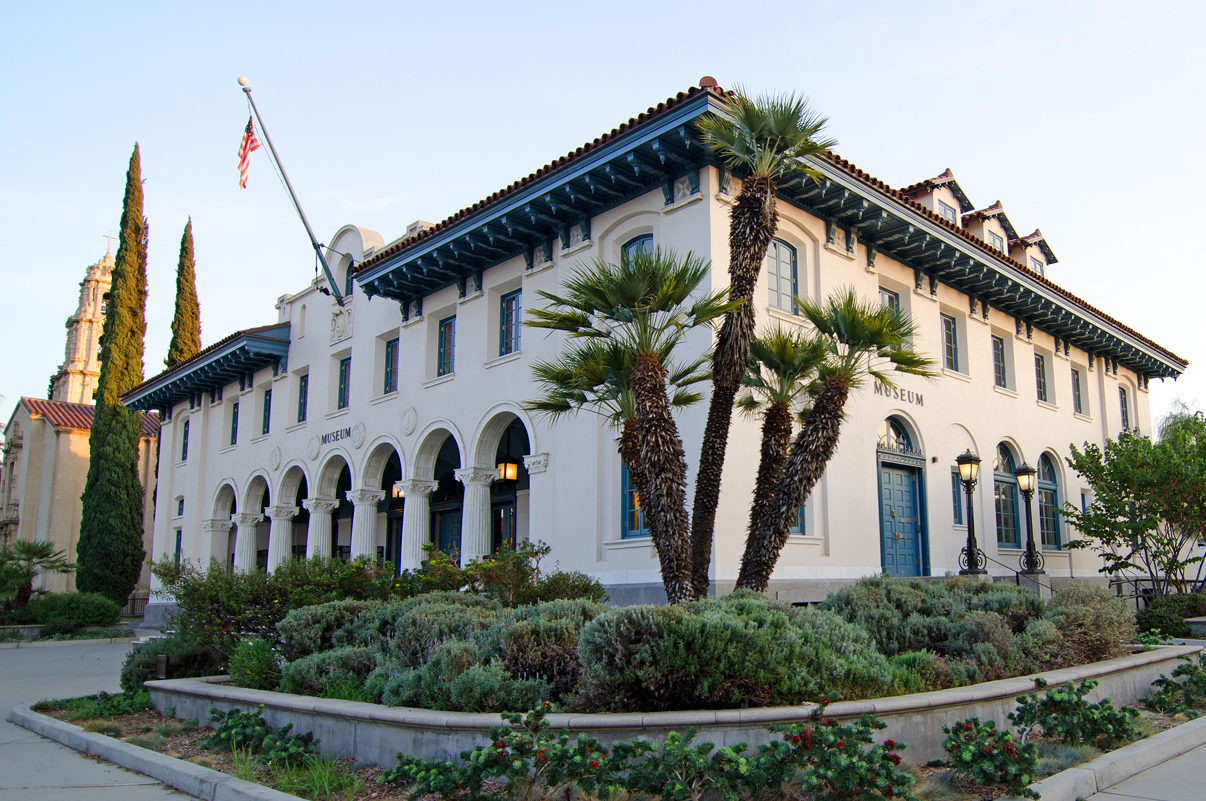
Museum of Riverside

=== Local government ===
Riverside is a charter city governed by a mayor and city council. The mayor is elected in a citywide election. The city council has seven members, each elected from single member wards. A city manager is responsible for ongoing city services.

In Riverside's Comprehensive Annual Financial Report for the fiscal year ended June 30, 2013, the city's government accounts were reported to have $244 million in revenues and $365 million in expenditures, with the deficiency made up by the issuance of long-term debt and transfers from the city-owned utilities (including electric and water). The report also indicates that over the prior nine years, the number of city employees increased by 23.6% to 2,686 FTE, outpacing the 12.5% increase in the number of residents.

In 2024, Riverside residents approved Measure L, which would create a city-appointed inspector-general position that would be charged with "investigating, auditing, inspecting and providing operational performance evaluations for city offices, special districts and joint powers authorities."

=== Federal and state representation ===
Under the electoral maps drawn by the Citizens' Redistricting Commission, which were first used in the 2022 elections and will remain in effect through at least 2030, Riverside's state and federal legislative districts have changed substantially.

In the California State Legislature, the City of Riverside is in the 31st senatorial district, represented by Democrat Sabrina Cervantes. In the California State Assembly, it is split between the 58th Assembly district, represented by Republican Leticia Castillo, and the 63rd Assembly district, represented by Republican Natasha Johnson. A very small portion of the city is in the 60th Assembly district, represented by Democrat Corey Jackson.

In the United States House of Representatives, Riverside is in California's 39th congressional district, represented by Democrat Mark Takano. A very small portion (a few blocks) of the city is in California's 41st congressional district, represented by Republican Ken Calvert. In the United States Senate, California is represented by Democrats Adam Schiff and Alex Padilla.

=== Courts ===
- Federal
  - United States District Court, Central District of California, Eastern Division
  - United States Bankruptcy Court, 9th Circuit Bankruptcy Appellate Panel
  - United States Bankruptcy Court, Central District of California
- State
  - California Court of Appeal, Fourth District, Division Two
  - Superior Court of California, County of Riverside

=== Crime ===
Riverside's crime rate has shown a drop over the past several years. According to the FBI's Uniform Crime Reporting Statistics database, from 2002 to 2014 violent crime fell to 1,384 from 2,026 events, and property crime to 9,864 from 13,135 events. During this time, the population of the city rose by 21%. To help reduce gang-related crime, the city developed Project Bridge, an anti-gang program under the city of Riverside's Park and Recreation Department. Gang activity has been reported to center in the Casa Blanca, Arlanza and Eastside neighborhoods.

Of the 60 largest U.S. police departments in 2015, the Riverside Police Department was the only department whose police did not kill anyone that year.

== Education ==
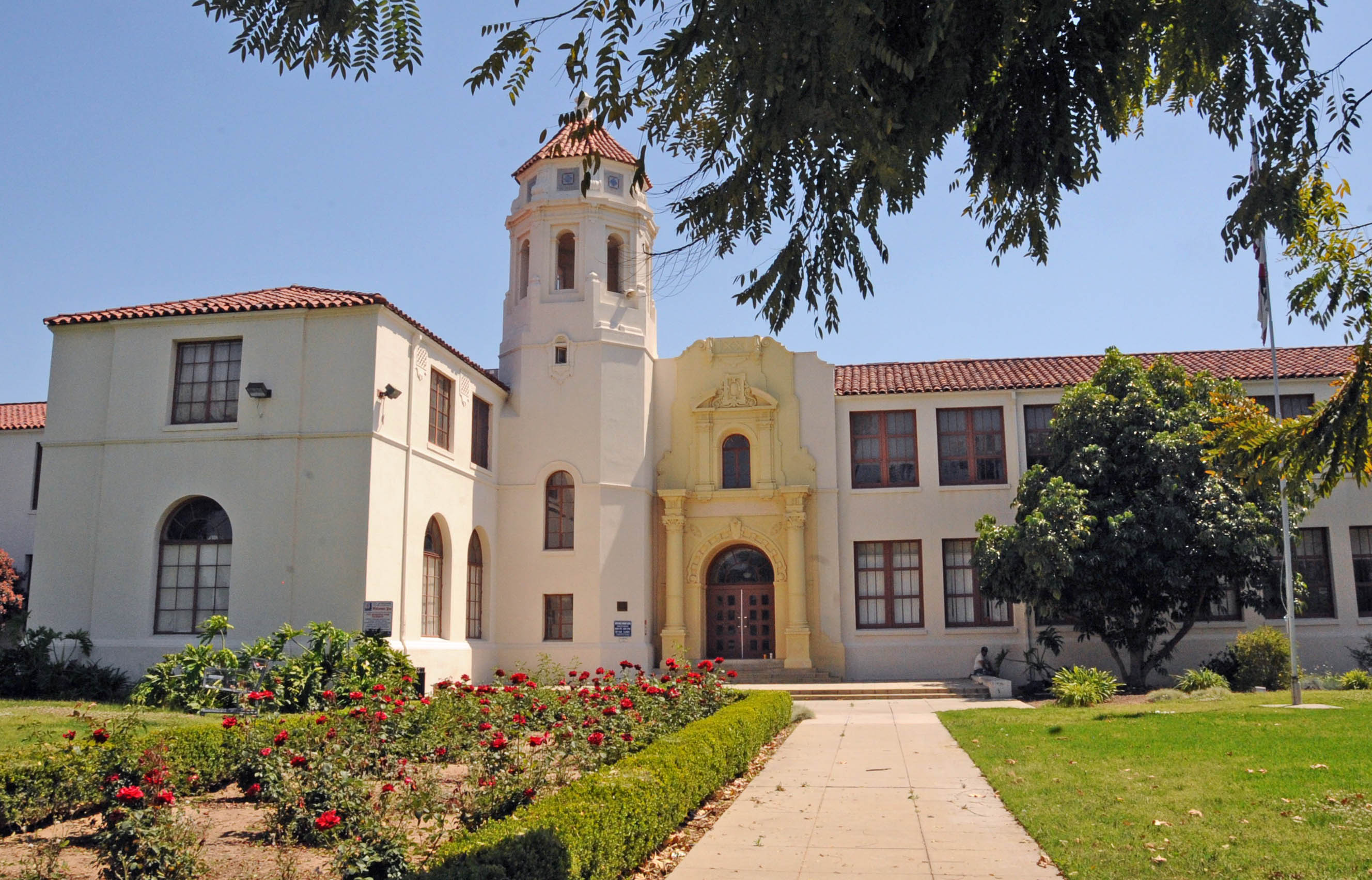
University Heights Junior High School

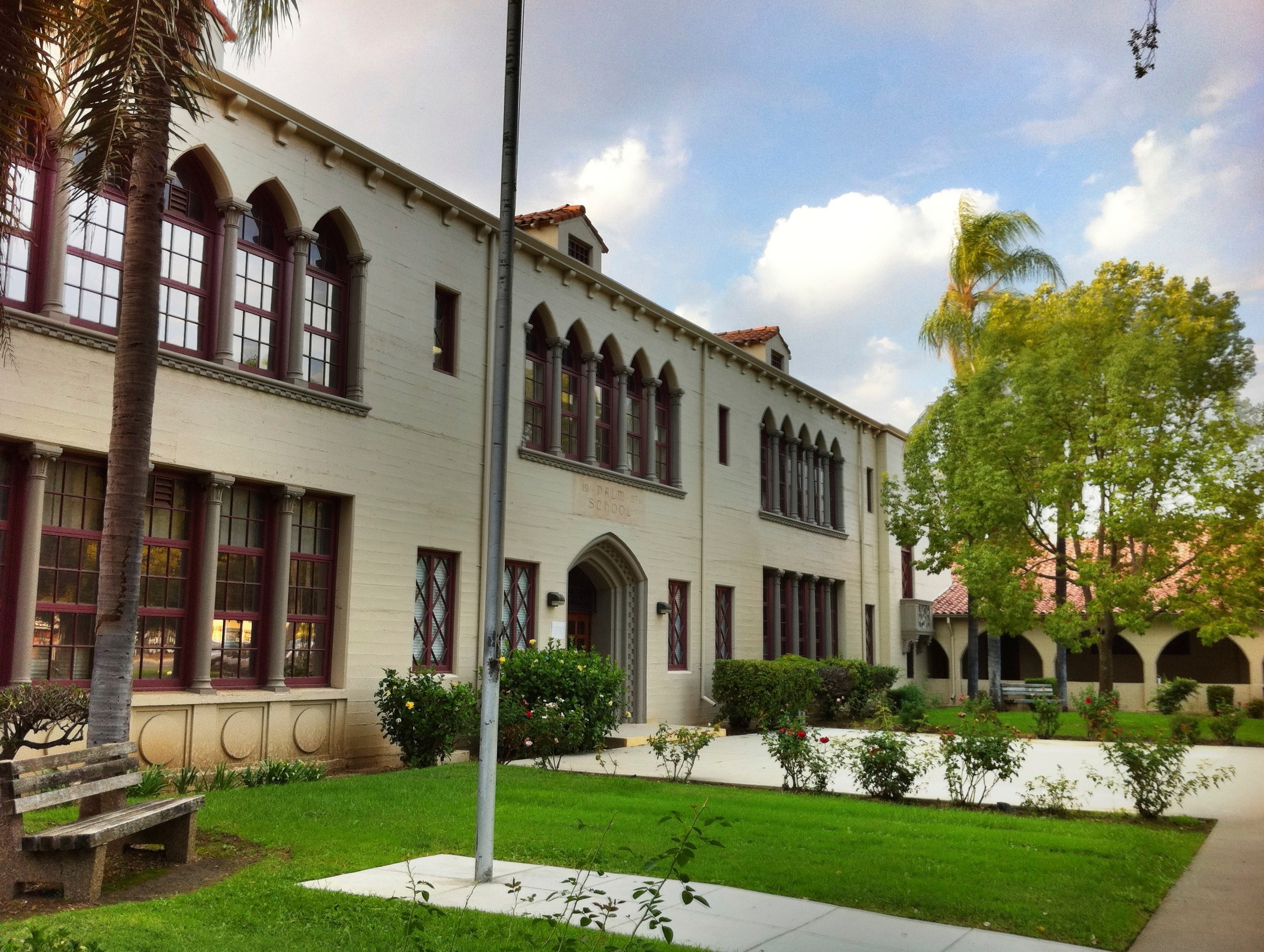
Palm Elementary School

=== Colleges and universities ===
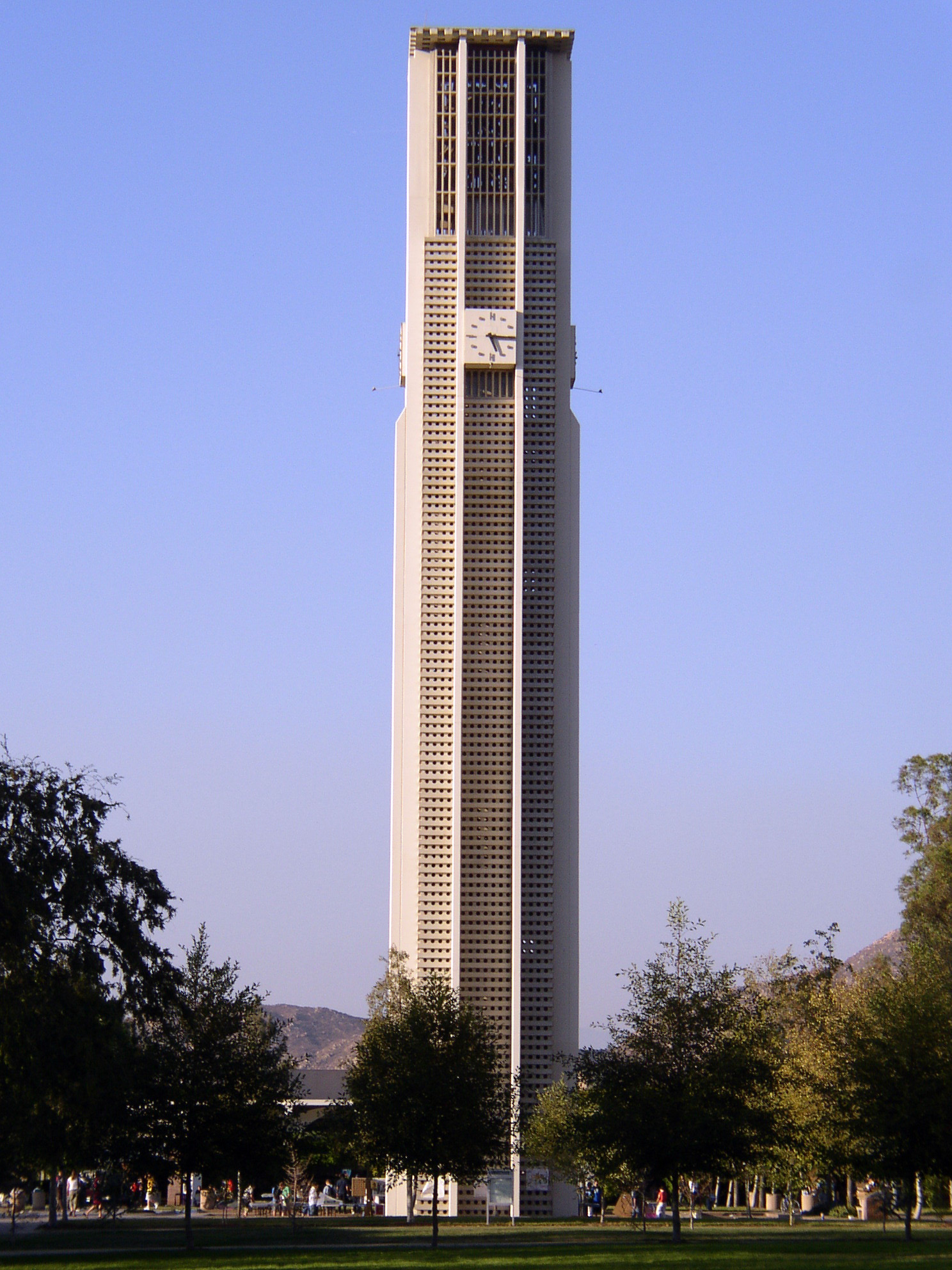
The 161 ft (49 m), 48-bell carillon tower at the University of California, Riverside

Institutions of higher learning include:

- California Baptist University
- La Sierra University
- National University (branch campus in Riverside)
- Riverside City College
- Riverside Royals College
- University of California, Riverside

=== Vocational schools ===
- Brightwood College
- UEI College
- Platt College
- American College of Healthcare
- Masters Vocational College
- US College
- Northwest College

=== Secondary schools ===
==== Public school districts and high schools ====
Riverside is served by two school districts:

- Riverside Unified School District serves eastern Riverside.
  - High schools include:
    - Arlington High School
    - Martin Luther King High School
    - John W. North High School
    - Riverside Polytechnic High School also known as Poly High School
    - Ramona High School
    - Riverside Virtual School
    - Riverside STEM High School
  - Continuation high schools include:
    - Abraham Lincoln High School (continuation)
    - Raincross High School (continuation)
    - Summit View High School (continuation)
- Alvord Unified School District serves western Riverside.
  - High schools include:
    - La Sierra High School
    - Norte Vista High School
    - Hillcrest High School
  - Continuation high schools include:
    - Alvord High School (continuation)

A portion of eastern Riverside is in Moreno Valley Unified School District.

===== Other public secondary schools =====
Two notable institutions of learning, for specified student bodies, are also located in Riverside:

- California School for the Deaf, Riverside (CSDR) for the Deaf and Hard of Hearing from Preschool to 12th grade has been open since 1952.
- Sherman Indian High School of the Bureau of Indian Education, is for Native American tribal members from 9th to 12th grade; it has been open since 1878.

==== Private secondary schools ====
- Bethel Christian School
- Eastside Christian Academy
- Harvest Christian school
- La Sierra Academy (Seventh-day Adventist)
- Notre Dame High School (Roman Catholic)
- Riverside Christian High School
- Woodcrest Christian High School
- Carniege Schools Riverside

=== Initiative to raise college graduation rates ===
Riverside won a $3 million grant from the Bill and Melinda Gates Foundation in 2010. As a result, the Completion Counts initiative was created as a joint partnership by the city of Riverside, Riverside City College, Alvord Unified School District, Riverside Unified School District, Riverside County Office of Education, UC Riverside, and the Greater Riverside Chambers of Commerce to double college graduation rates by 2020. Only Riverside, New York City, San Francisco, and Mesa, Arizona received such a grant.

The partnership is creating measures that seek to assist students across Riverside earn a degree. For example, RCC will now give 2012 graduates of AUSD and RUSD priority class registration, and allows two years guaranteed to complete an associate degree or transfer to a four-year university. Completion Counts is also ensuring that AUSD, RUSD and RCC work together to create a seamless math and English curriculum to prepare students for college-level work. High school and college student counselors are meeting regularly to agree on the best ways to get students ready for college.

== Media ==
Riverside is the home to the Fox Performing Arts Center. The theater is best known for being the first theater to screen the most successful film in box-office history when adjusted for inflation, the 1939 film Gone with the Wind.

== Transportation ==
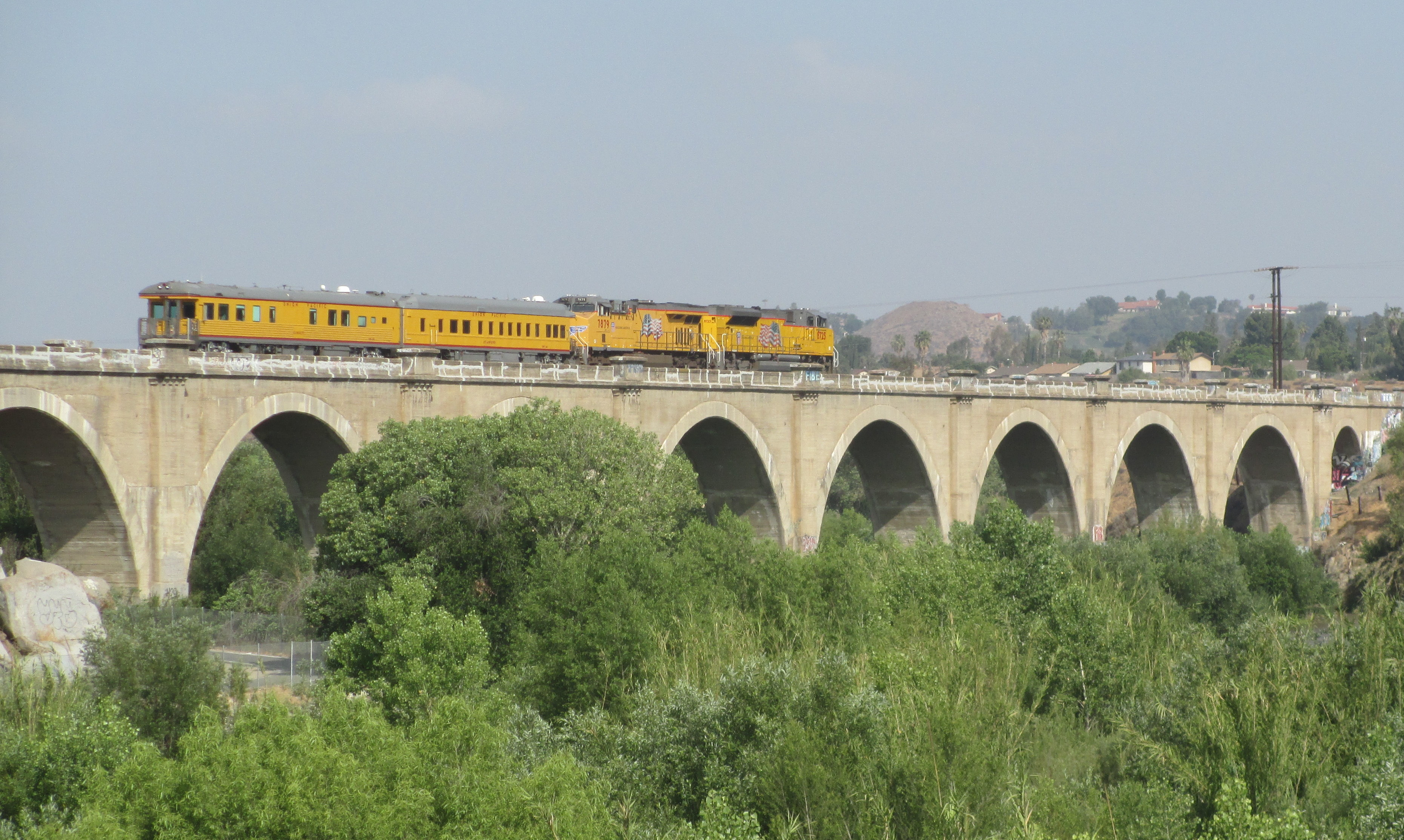
Santa Ana River Viaduct

=== Highways ===
Riverside is served by three major freeways: I-215, State Route 60, and State Route 91. These three freeways meet in northeastern Riverside at a multi-level interchange that was rebuilt in 2007.

=== Rail lines ===
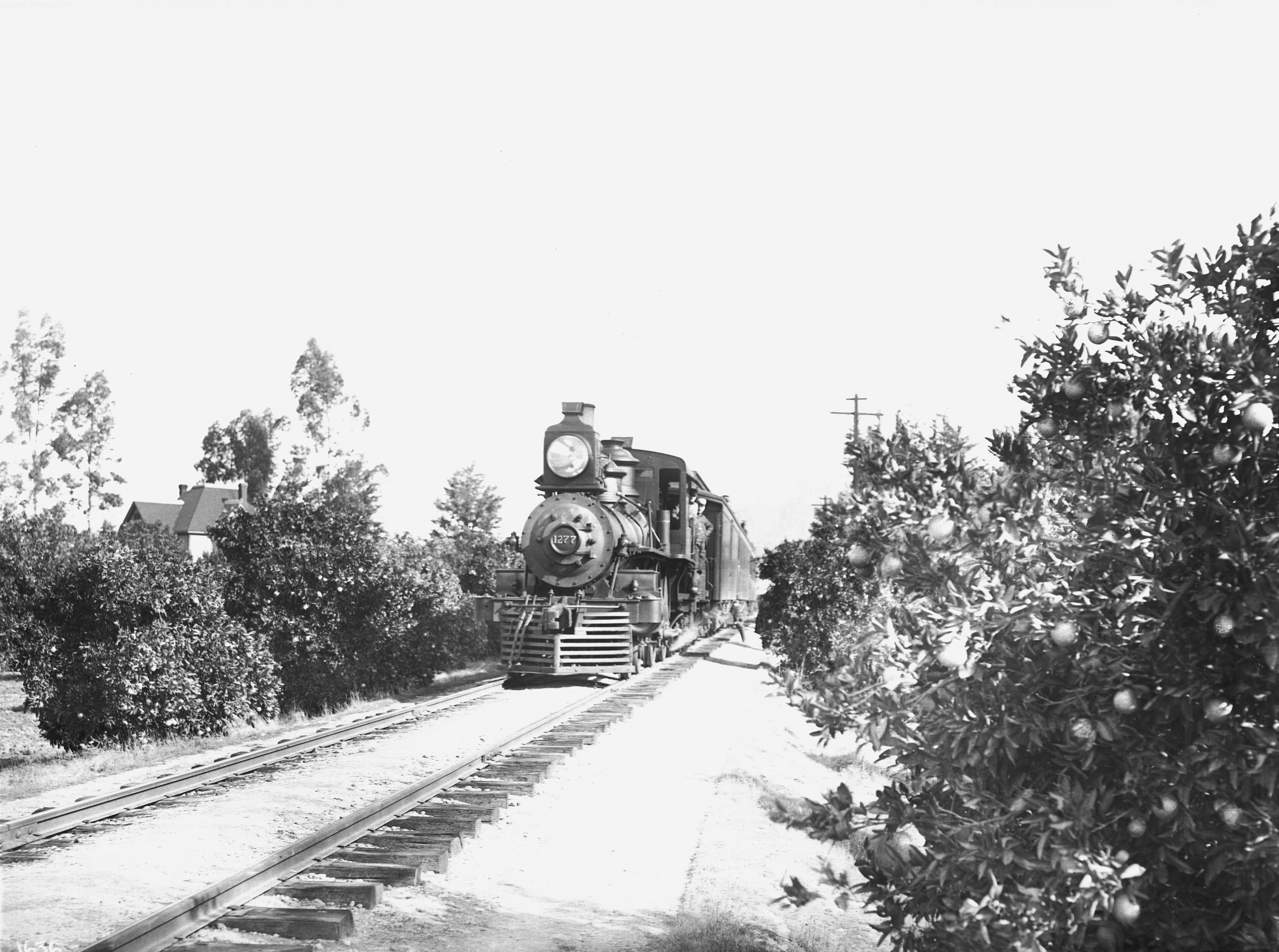
Southern Pacific Railroad train running through the tracks in an orange grove in Riverside, California, c. 1910

The city contains three Metrolink commuter rail stations: Riverside-Downtown, Riverside-La Sierra, and Riverside-Hunter Park/UCR. The first two are both served by the 91/Perris Valley and Inland Empire-Orange County lines, and the Downtown station is served by the Riverside Line on weekdays, and the San Bernardino Line on weekends. The Hunter Park station is served by the 91/Perris Valley Line on weekdays only. Amtrak's Southwest Chief, which runs from Los Angeles to Chicago, also serves the city.

=== Bus lines ===
Local bus service is provided by the Riverside Transit Agency. Intercity bus service is provided by Omnitrans Greyhound Lines, Amtrak California, and a handful of small operators serving the cross-border market into Mexico.

=== Airports ===
The nearest airport for commercial airline service is Ontario International Airport in Ontario, California. The Riverside Municipal Airport is an airport within Riverside city limits, but it does not have commercial airline service. It is primarily used for private aviation and is also the location for the annual Riverside Air Show.

== Sister cities ==
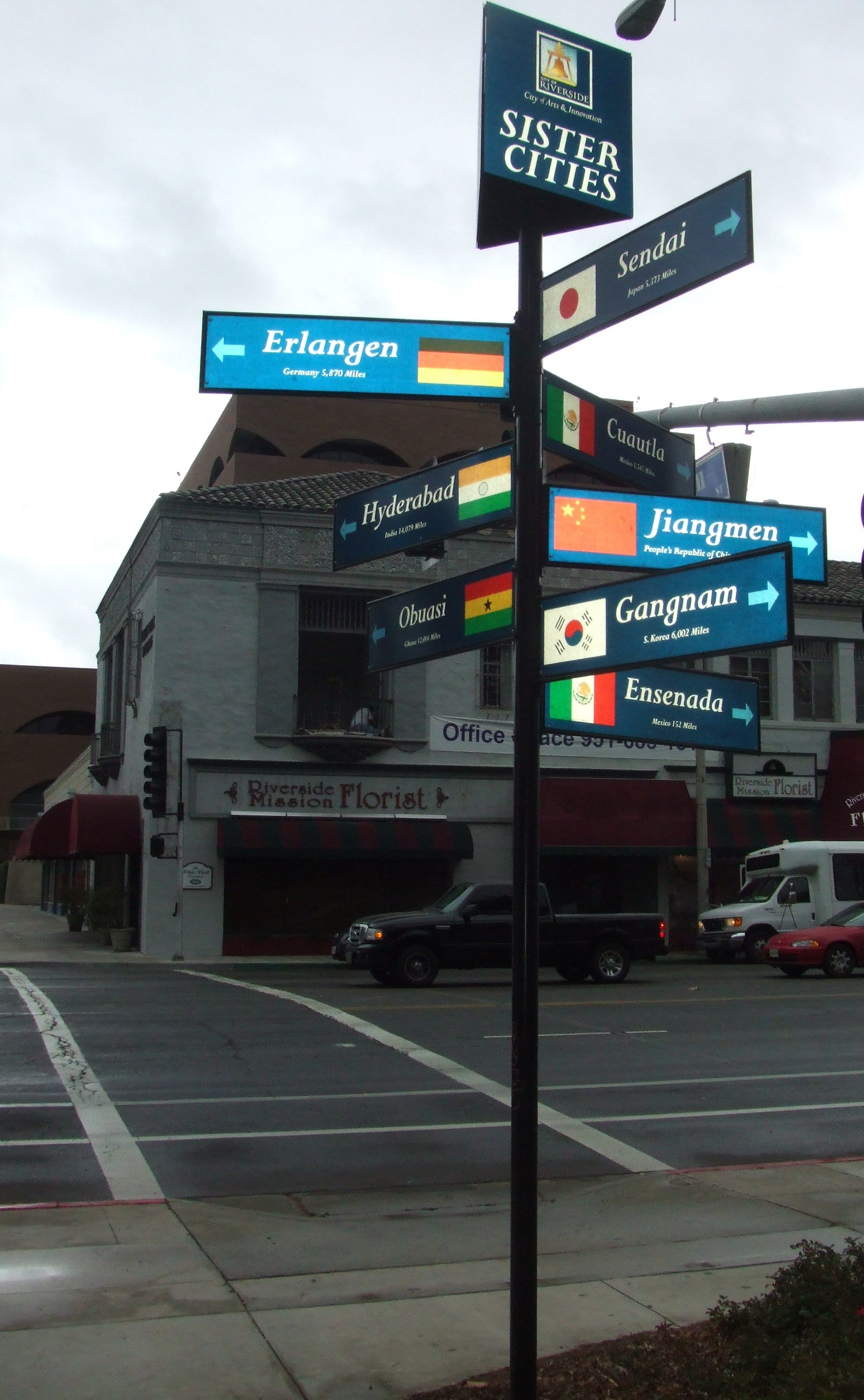
Sister city sign in front of White Park in downtown Riverside

Riverside has nine sister cities, as designated by Sister Cities International:

- Sendai, Japan
- Cuautla, Morelos, Mexico
- Ensenada, Baja California, Mexico
- Jiangmen, China
- Gangnam, South Korea
- Hyderabad, India
- Obuasi, Ghana
- Erlangen, Germany
- Cần Thơ, Vietnam

The Sendai Committee is working on setting up a secure e-pal system whereby the residents of Sendai and Riverside can exchange emails in a fashion similar to pen pals. The aim is to promote grassroots cultural exchange between the two sister cities.

The city of Riverside established an economic partnership program with the state of Oaxaca, Mexico, in the early 2000s.

== See also ==
- California Riverside Ballet
- Largest cities in Southern California
- Ranchos of California
- Saint Andrew Orthodox Christian Church
- List of U.S. cities with large Hispanic populations
