= Riverside Convention Center =

Convention center in Riverside, California

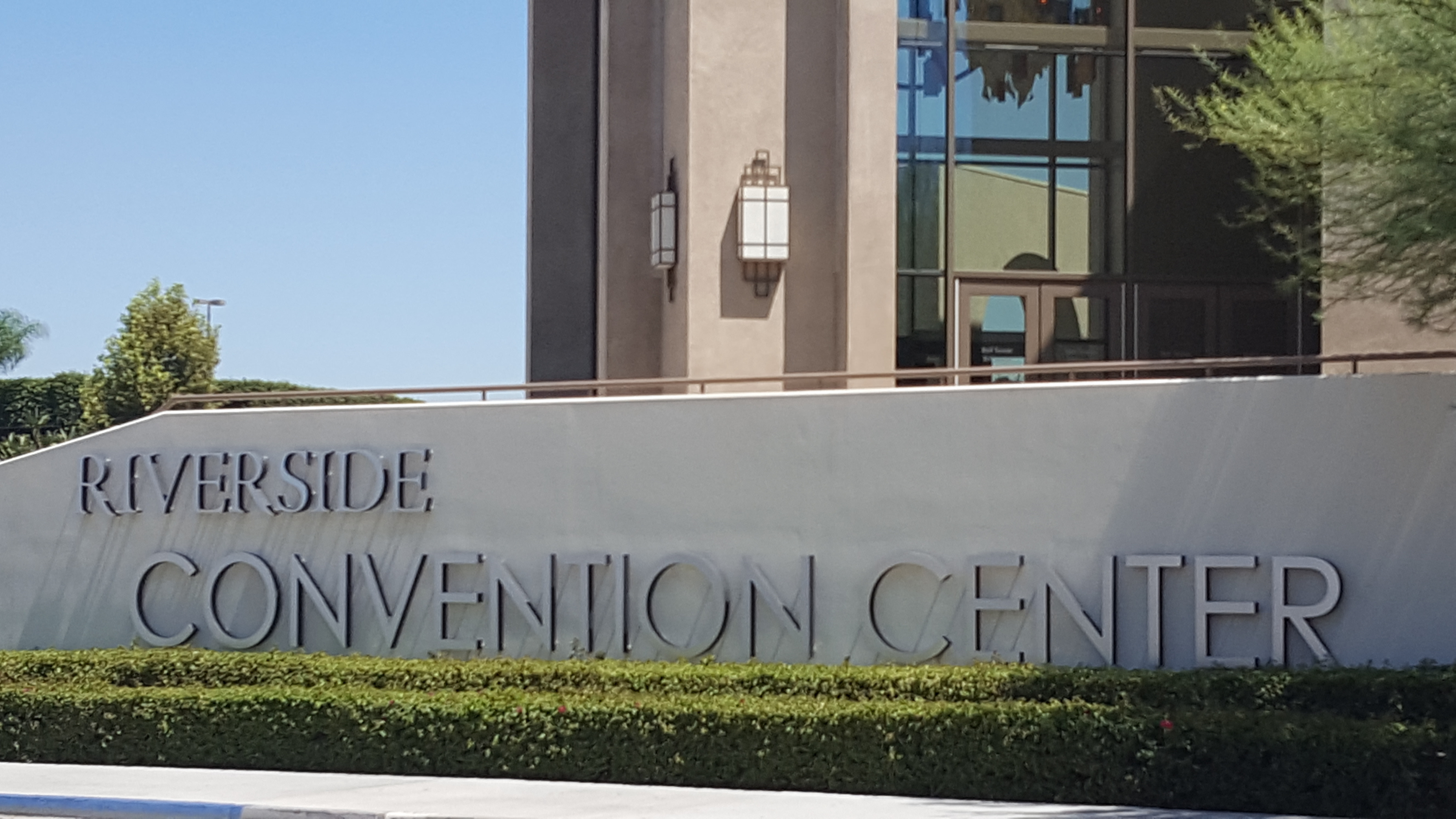
- Interactive map of Riverside Convention Center
- Address: 3637 5th St; Riverside, California
- Coordinates: 33.98515°N 117.3715°W
- Owner: Riverside Convention and Visitors Bureau

Construction
- Built: 2014
- Opened: 2014

Website
- Riverside Convention Center website

The Riverside Convention Center is a convention center in downtown Riverside, California. The convention center hosts conventions and events in 70,000 sq. ft. of total meeting space and 30,000 sq. ft. of exhibit space. It has 26 meeting rooms with the largest room being 27,953 sq. ft. and the second largest room being 10,920 sq. ft.

== History ==
The Convention Center was completely rebuilt in 2014 on the same site as the previous convention center. The convention center has hosted conventions, home and garden shows, conferences, meetings and weddings.

== See also ==
- List of convention centers in the United States
