= Riverside County Office of Education =

The Riverside County Office of Education (RCOE) serves as an intermediary between the California Department of Education and local school districts. It provides a wide range of educational and administrative services to the 23 school districts and more than 423,000 students in Riverside County.

The office has three components: the elected County Superintendent of Schools, who serves a four-year term of office; the seven elected members of the County Board of Education, who also serve four-year terms; and the body of employees in the organization, all of whom are employed by the County Superintendent.

RCOE has served Riverside County for nearly 125 years. With well over 420,000 students, RCOE is California’s fourth-largest county office of education. The county's 23 districts vary in size from Desert Center, with just over a handful of students, to Corona-Norco, with more than 50,000.

County offices serve three legally mandated functions:

- Meeting the needs of students outside of their local school district educational programs and services
- Working with local school districts to ensure they are providing students with the best educational programs and services possible, and remaining financially solvent in the process
- As the Board of Education, primarily a policy and appellate role.

Two other significant roles played by county offices are:

- Recognizing student achievement and educator excellence
- Providing county-wide educational events focusing on the success of all students

RCOE's six service divisions, and the Office of the Superintendent, employ approximately 1,900 people. The divisions are:

- Administration and Business Services
- Educational Leadership Services
- Personnel Services
- Student Programs and Services
- Educational Services
- Children and Family Services

Because the county is so extensive, both of RCOE's regional offices in Murrieta and Indio include employees from a number of these divisions.

== History ==
On March 11, 1893, California Governor Henry Markham signed a bill that took 7,090 square miles (18,400 km^{2}) from San Diego and San Bernardino counties—which were in disagreement over many issues—to form the new County of Riverside.

San Timoteo Canyon Schoolhouse, built as an adobe building in 1856, was the first school in the territory that became Riverside County. The original schoolhouse accommodated 25–40 students from grades one to eight, and served the pioneer families as well as the temporary students of work crews on the Southern Pacific Railroad.

Well-documented history of Riverside County schools begins with the establishment of the county and consequent appointment of Riverside County Superintendent of Schools Lyman Gregory on May 9, 1893. Gregory’s office was in the original courthouse at Eighth and Lime Streets in downtown Riverside. During the time of Edward Hyatt (1903), a new county courthouse on Main Street was built. At that time, the superintendency remained an elected position, but the office was part of county government until it gained fiscal independence in 1975.

The Riverside County Office of Education has grown to nearly 2,000 employees working at offices in Riverside, Murrieta and Indio, with a budget of $257 million.

The current superintendent of schools is Dr. Edwin Gomez. At the time of his appointment, Riverside County schools had more than 400,000 students at 434 sites, under the jurisdiction of 23 local school districts, with more than 36,000 teachers and other school employees.
