= Saint Andrew Orthodox Christian Church =

Coordinates: 33.964061°N 117.330413°W

- The church pictured in 2011
- Saint Andrew Orthodox Christian Church
- Location: 4700 Canyon Crest Drive; Riverside, California
- Denomination: Greek Orthodox
- Website: www.saintandrew.net

History
- Founded: 1992
- Consecrated: December 3, 2011

Architecture
- Architect: CJK Design Group of San Francisco
- Architectural type: Byzantine
- Groundbreaking: 12 Oct 2008
- Completed: 2010
- Construction cost: $5 million (est.)

Specifications
- Capacity: 700
- Materials: Marble

Administration
- Diocese: Antiochian Diocese of Los Angeles and the West

Clergy
- Archbishop: Saba Esber
- Priest: V. Rev. Fr. Josiah Trenham

Saint Andrew Orthodox Christian Church is a parish church of the Antiochian Orthodox Christian Archdiocese of North America, an archdiocese of the Greek Orthodox Patriarchate of Antioch and All the East. The church is dedicated to Saint Andrew, the First-Called Apostle, is near the intersection of Canyon Crest Drive and Martin Luther King Boulevard in Riverside, California, across from the University of California, Riverside.

The church building, modeled after a 13th-century World Heritage Site in Thessaloniki, Greece named for St. Catherine of Alexandria, was completed in 2011 as the first Byzantine-style Orthodox Christian church in Riverside.

== History ==
Saint Andrew Orthodox Church began in 1989 as several families from Riverside neighboring Corona began meeting weekly for prayer services with the blessing of the local bishop. While there was no full-time priest to serve the community, the four founding families began to run local ads, produce a monthly newsletter and conduct outreach. In November 1992 the mission station was granted formal mission status and given the name "Saint Andrew" by the late Metropolitan Philip Saliba. In November 1997, Saint Andrew Mission was elevated to official "church" status by then Archbishop Joseph Al-Zehlaoui of the Diocese of Los Angeles and the West. At this time the parish relocated their worship from a storefront to two industrial warehouses in west Riverside. On May 1, 1998, Father Josiah Trenham was appointed as the pastor. During his tenure the membership of Saint Andrew grew.

== Church building ==
With a rapidly growing parish, the Saint Andrew community sought land of their own in which to build a traditional Orthodox-style church. In 1999, the parish purchased its first real estate property at its current location. This same year, the Riverside City Council approved a three-phase construction plan consisting of a Fellowship Hall (Phase 1), a Church Temple (Phase 2), and a Christian Education Center (Phase 3).

Construction of the Fellowship Hall was completed in 2002; it served as the interim worship center until the Church Temple was completed in 2011. In 2004 Saint Andrew acquired an additional three-acre lot adjacent to their current property. This acquisition more than doubled the size of the Saint Andrew campus and a major redesign of the building plans was enacted. The temple was modeled after the St. Catherine Church in Thessaloniki, Greece.

Ground was broken on October 12, 2008, in a ceremony presided over by Bishops Joseph of Los Angeles and the West and Benjamin Peterson of San Francisco of the Orthodox Church in America.

The basic design of the church is a large cross within a square. Much marble stone is used, both on the inside and outside of the structure. The marble comes from seven different nations and over a dozen quarries. There are seven distinct domes, 74 arches, 14 barrel vaults, 16 groin vaults, 8 inverted convex ceiling domes and a central dome.

The church was built oriented toward the east, in accordance with tradition. On the western side there are eight doors which were handcrafted and carved in Antakya, Turkey. According to the Christian New Testament, this ancient city is where the disciples of Christ were first called Christians. The central grand doors stand 12 feet (3.7 m) tall and 7 feet (2.1 m) wide. Each is made of solid quercus kelloggii, a black oak. The images carved within the doors depict Christ, the Holy Virgin Mary, Saint Andrew, Saint Peter, Saint John Chrysostom, Saint Anthusa, Saint Simeon the Stylite and Saint Simeon of the Admirable Mountain.

A small plaza with tumbled travertine leading up to the main entrance of the church was inspired by a 6th-century monastery in Saidnaya, Syria, built by the Emperor Justinian.

Hanging in the Saint Andrew belfry are five bells cast in Russia. Fourteen chandeliers, made in Athens, Greece, light the interior of the temple and the church's baptismal chapel.

The iconography of the church is hand-painted by Orthodox-iconographer monks from Buena Vista, Colorado. The iconography, depicting scenes from Christ's life, his miracles, parables and hundreds of saints, was still in progress in 2013, and would be one of the most elaborate iconographic schemes in the US when completed, with no wall space remaining unadorned. Cost was estimated to be in the millions of dollars, with completion planned for 2021.

The first Divine Liturgy was celebrated in the new church temple on the Orthodox Feast of Palm Sunday, 2011.

The temple was formally opened with the Service of Consecration on December 3, 2011, presided over by Bishops Joseph and Benjamin, and attended by over sixty priests and deacons, and hundreds of laity.

== Ministries and community outreach ==
=== Burial Society ===
The Saint Andrew Burial Society is a ministry of the church designed to prepare the body of reposed parishioners for funeral and burial. Two teams of parishioners, one male and one female, have been trained by a local mortuary in proper burial preparations that accord with Orthodox Christian Tradition. Many families of the deceased choose not to employ the services of a mortuary or funeral home, relying entirely on the Burial Society in the traditional practices of Christian burial. The dead can be preserved and lie in state in a purpose-designed parish funeral chapel.

=== Feeding the homeless ===
The St. Andrew Church homeless ministry serves food at the Hulen Homeless Shelter in Riverside weekly. The shelter, operated by Path of Life Ministries, offers a thirty- to sixty-day program that provides adults with temporary housing and assistance in obtaining important documents, job readiness, computer workshops, counseling, meals, hygiene supplies and Bible studies. The shelter holds 129 beds for qualified single men and women in separate dormitories.

=== Riverside Greek Fest ===
Each fall St. Andrew hosts The Riverside Greek Fest, a city-sponsored event. The 2013 event was said to "bring a little bit of art and culture to the city" and "fully immerse you in the Greek culture". The event includes Greek cuisine, traditional folk dancing, and tours of the Byzantine-style temple. In 2013, the Riverside Greek Fest attracted nearly 10,000 visitors, including city officials, and was the third largest event of its kind in Riverside.

=== Save the Cross ===
In 2012 the group Americans United for Separation of Church and State notified the city of Riverside it would sue if a cross that had stood atop publicly owned Mount Rubidoux since 1907 was not removed. The pastor of St Andrew created a Web site and organised cross supporters after Riverside started considering whether to sell the cross site. He told the council he would chain himself to the cross to prevent its removal; ultimately local groups bought the land to allow the cross to remain.

== See also ==
- Antiochian Orthodox Christian Archdiocese of North America
- Assembly of Canonical Orthodox Bishops of the United States of America
