= List of landmarks in Riverside, California =

This list of landmarks in Riverside, California includes officially designated federal, state, and local landmarks within the city of Riverside, California, United States, as well as other notable points of interest within the city. Landmarks that are closely associated with the city, but outside the city's boundaries, have also been included.

== Riverside City Landmarks ==
	Image	Name/location	County	State	Federal	Description
1		Mission Inn (3649 Mission Inn Ave); 33°58′59″N 117°22′22″W	RCHL	761; CPHI	71000173	A composite of many architectural styles, the Inn is generally considered the largest Mission Revival Style building in the United States. Designated a National Historic Landmark (NHL) on 1977-05-05.
2		Riverside County Historic Courthouse (4050 Main St)	21	CPHI		
3		Universalist Unitarian Church of Riverside (3525 Mission Inn Ave); 33°58′56″N 117°22′17″W			78000736	Originally the All Souls Universalist Church. Built in the English Gothic style, the church is made of unreinforced brick faced with Arizona red sandstone. It has a 50-foot (15 m) tower, stained glass windows, and was completed in 1892.
4		Magnolia United Presbyterian Church (7200 Magnolia Ave)				Founded as "First Presbyterian Church of Arlington, California", this Gothic Revival church was designed and built by architect A. W. Boggs in 1881. It is the oldest existing church building in the city of Riverside.
5		Heritage House (Bettner-McDavid House) (8193 Magnolia Ave)			73000423	
6		First Congregational Church (United Church of Christ) (3504 Mission Inn Ave)	10	CPHI	97000297	The church was designed by architect Myron Hunt in the Spanish Baroque Churrigueresque style. Construction began in 1912, and the church was dedicated on January 25, 1914. In 1989 a 24-bell cast bronze carillon, made by the Paccard Foundry in France, was installed in the church's 135-foot (41 m) bell tower, the only pealing bells in Southern California.
7		First Church of Christ, Scientist (3606 Lemon St); 33°58′57″N 117°22′14″W			92001250	
8		Victoria Avenue (Myrtle Ave to Boundary Lane)			00001267	1892 – This seven-mile divided avenue, from Myrtle Ave to the city limits, was planned by Matthew Gage, canal builder and developer of Arlington Heights sub-division. The original planting was supervised by Franz P. Hosp, famed landscape architect. Cultural Heritage Landmark No. 8 City of Riverside
9		San Pedro, Los Angeles, & Salt Lake RR Depot (3751 Vine St)			77000326	
10		Bandshell at Fairmount Park (Fairmount Boulevard and Market St)				
11		Museum of Riverside; Post Office and Federal Building (1914) (3580 Mission Inn Ave)			78000737	
12	Upload image	S. C. Evans Residence (7606 Mt. Vernon St)				
13	Upload image	Benedict Castle (1850 Benedict Ave)				
14		Buena Vista Drive and Carlson Park (Mission Inn Ave between Redwood Dr and the Santa Ana River)				
15		Parent Navel Orange Tree (Magnolia Ave at Arlington Ave)		20		
16		Sherman Indian Museum (9010 Magnolia Ave)			80000831	Established in 1900, and named for James Schoolcraft Sherman, the school first was a vocational school for Native Americans from California, but later became a high school for Native American students. The building now houses the Sherman Indian Museum with exhibits of Native American history.
17		Riverside Municipal Auditorium (3485 Mission Inn Ave)			78000738	
18		Riverside Art Museum (3425 Mission Inn Ave)			82002227	
19		Chinatown Site (Brockton Ave at Tequesquite Ave)	8	CPHI	90000151	
20		Fred Stebler House (4532 Sixth St)				
21		Loring Building (3673 Main St)	6	CPHI		
22		New Jerusalem Church (3645 Locust St)				
23		Harada House (3356 Lemon St)			77000325	Designated a National Historic Landmark (NHL) on 1990-12-14.
24		The Gage Canal				
25	Upload image	Edgewild (2320 Mary St)				
26		Mount Rubidoux (west of downtown Riverside)	7	CPHI		
27		John W. North Park (Mission Inn Avenue at Vine St)	45	CPHI		
28		Old City Hall (3612 Mission Inn Ave)				
29		Rockledge (2812 Ivy St)				
30		Devine House (4475 Twelfth St)				
31		Raeburn (2508 Raeburn Dr)				
32		Arcade Building (3602 University Ave)				
33		Bonnett Building (3800 Orange St)				
34		Estudillo House (4515 Sixth St)				Home of Judge Francis Miguel Estudillo and his wife Mary (Traphagen) Estudillo. The Judge was the son of Miguel Estudillo who served in the California State Assembly and the California Senate.
35		Irvine House (3115 Brockton Ave)				
36		Waite House (3121 Mulberry St)				
37		Cressman House (3390 Orange St)				
38		Grant School (4011 Fourteenth St)				
39		Riverside Fox Theater (3801 Mission Inn Ave)				
40	Upload image	Seventh Street (from the Santa Fe Depot to the Buena Vista Bridge)				
41		Young Men's Christian Association Building (YMCA) (3485 University Ave)				
42		Greystones (6190 Hawarden Dr)				
43		Lerner Building (3605-49 Tenth St)				
44	Upload image	Hole Mansion (11316 Cypress Ave)				
45		Collins-Seaton House (2374 Mission Inn Ave)				
46		Arlington Branch Library (9556 Magnolia Ave)			93000668	
47		Batkin-Chrysler House (4539 Rubidoux Ave)				
48		Riverside City College Quadrangle (4800 Magnolia Ave)				
49	Upload image	University Heights Junior High School (2060 University Ave)			93000547	
50		Rouse's Department Store Building (3834 Main St)				
51		Ward House (2969 Mission Inn Ave)				
52		Peter J. Weber House (1510 University Ave)				
53	Upload image	Moulton House (7335 Magnolia Ave)				
54		Victoria Bridge (Victoria Ave between Myrtle Ave and Woodbine St)				1928 – The original Victoria Bridge was wooden and built in 1891 to unite the new Arlington Heights tract with downtown. Designed by William Irving and built by private developers, the bridge was deeded to the city in 1891. The wooden bridge supported a streetcar line from 1901 to 1924, but suffered from loads too heavy for its design. The current, 1928, bridge is of reinforced concrete and was designed by R.V. Leeson of Los Angeles. Cultural Heritage Board Landmark No. 54 City of Riverside
55		Hoover House (3858 Redwood Dr)				
56	Palm School	Palm Elementary School (6735 Magnolia Ave)				
57		White Park (Chestnut St and Tenth St)				
58	Upload image	Orchard House (6499 Hawarden Dr)				
59	Upload image	Robert Bettner House (7995 Magnolia Ave)				
60		The Chicago White Sox Redwood Tree (Low Park)				
61		Montezuma Bald Cypress Trees (Fairmount Park)				
62	Upload image	Magnolia Avenue Parkways and Center Median (between Arlington Ave and San Rafael Way)				
63	Upload image	Palm Grove (Hunter Park, near the intersection of Columbia St and Iowa Ave)				
64		Roosevelt Palm (Victoria Ave at Myrtle St)				Originally Queen Victoria palm planted by President Theodore Roosevelt May 8, 1903. Marked March 27, 1965 by Jurupa Parlor No. 298 Native Daughters of the Golden West Riverside, California
65		Native Sycamore Tree (median island on La Paz Lane at Bubbling Well Rd)				
66	Upload image	Horse Chestnut Tree (Victoria Ave center divider at Mary St)				
67		Evergreen Cemetery and Riverside Mausoleum (4414 Fourteenth St)				
68		Mitchell House (3209 Mulberry St)				
69		Fairmount Park (Fairmount Blvd and Market St)				
70		Harwood Hall House (4570 University Ave)				
71		Shiels House (3620 Fifteenth St)				
72		McIntyre House (4586 Olivewood Ave)				
73		Newman Park and the De Anza Statue (Magnolia Ave at Fourteenth St)				
74		Buena Vista Bridge (Rubidoux Dr and Mission Inn Ave)				
75	Upload image	Stone House (3241 Mary Street)				
76		Stone House (2110 Seventh Street)				
77	Upload image	Hammer-Wallihan House (3563 Prospect Ave)				
78		Jarvis House (4492 Twelfth St)				
79	Upload image	Collier House (3092 Lime St)				
80		M. H. Simons Undertaking Chapel (3610 Eleventh St)			80000834	
81	Upload image	William Childs House (1151 Monte Vista Dr)			99000895	
82		Hartree Grove (6475 Victoria Ave)				
83		First Christian Church Parsonage (2933 Mission Inn Ave)				
84		Aurea Vista Hotel (3480 University Ave)				
85		Casa De Anza Motel (3425 Market St)				
86	Upload image	Rockledge Cottage (2575 Madison St)				
87		Tetley Building (4344-98 Market St)				
88	Upload image	Henry M. Streeter House (5211 Central Ave)				
89	Upload image	James M. Wood House (2490 Prince Albert Dr)				1891 – This colonial revival house was built for James M. Wood, renowned theater architect from Chicago. Mr. Wood had come to Riverside in 1889 to design the interior of the Loring Opera House. A.C. Willard, who had designed the exterior of the opera house, was also architect for Mr. Wood's Riverside residence. Mr. Wood stayed in his new house only infrequently and sold it in 1893. Cultural Heritage Board Landmark No. 89 City of Riverside
90		Roosevelt Building (3616-38 University Ave)				
91	Upload image	Ridgecourt (3261 Strong St)				
92		J. R. Willis Building (4336 Market St)				
93		John J. Hewitt House (3050 Orange St)				
94		Dr. Edmund Jaeger House – Delisted (4465 Sixth St)				
95		First United Brethren in Christ (2921 Sixth St)				
96	Upload image	Irving School (4341 Victoria Ave)				
97	Upload image	Chudzikowski Home Site (4998 Bushnell Ave)				
98		White Park Building (3900-3920 Market St)				
99	Upload image	Benjamin Rockhold Family House (4581 Indian Hill Rd)				
100		Santa Fe Depot (3750 Santa Fe St)				
101		Elmer A. Day House (3894 Fourth St)				
102	Upload image	Food Manufacturing Corporation (Tenth St and Howard St)				
103		Jaeger Family House (4462 Sixth St)				
104		Raymond Cree-Criddle House (4536 Beacon Way)				
105		Mary and Emerson Holt House (3504 Larchwood Pl)				
106		Alkire House (3245 Orange St)				
107		Holden House (7355 Magnolia Ave)				
108		Ames-Westbrook House (4811 Brockton Ave)				
109		Highgrove Drop and Upper Riverside Canal (Iowa Avenue and Spring Street)				
110		Piddington House (4385 Houghton Ave)				
111		Lillian M. Spurgeon Residence (4648 Ladera Lane)				
112		R.D. Brough/Harry W. Hammond Residence (4480 Mission Inn Ave)				
113		John Swanson House (4654 Sierra St)				
114		Jackson Building (3643 University Ave)				
115		A. N. Sweet Residence (4527 Mission Inn Ave)				
116		Ernest and Louise Clarke House (3456 Ramona Dr)				
117		C.O. Evans Residence (4622 Indian Hill Road)				
118	Upload image	Five Points Intersection (La Sierra Avenue and Pierce Street)				
119		Walter C. Banks House (3105 Pine Street)				
120		All Saints Episcopal Church (3847 Terracina Drive)				
121	Upload image	Bobby Bonds Residence (2112 Vasquez Place)				
122		Jasper Austin Payton Residence (5175 Myrtle Avenue)				
123	Upload image	Archibald C.E. Hawthorne House (3747 Monroe Street)				
124		Marcy Branch Library (3711 Central Avenue)				
125	Upload image	Clinton and Geraldine Marr Residence (6816 Hawarden Drive)				
126	Upload image	Philip Esbensen House (4259 Quail Road)				
127		Mackey House (6140 Tiburon Drive)				
128	Upload image	Wells-O'Toole House (1945 Arroyo Drive)				
129	Upload image	James E. and Jessie C. Shaw House (8410 Cleveland Avenue)				
130	Upload image	Trujillo Adobe (3669 W Center Street)				
131	Upload image	Willard and Elizabeth Winder House (5022 Myrtle Avenue)				
132	Upload image	Eugene Best House (5036 Myrtle Avenue)				
133	Upload image	Camp Anza Officer’s Club (5797 Picker Street)				
134		Nielsen Pool House (5050 Sedgwick Ave.)				1964 – The Nielsen Pool House was the residence of architectural engineer Svend Nielsen, known for his engineering work on structures such as the Forum in Los Angeles and the Discovery Cube in Santa Ana. The house is exemplifies Mid Century Modern Architecture, in addition to having unique architectural features including an indoor swimming pool with a retractable roof. The house was named landmark #134 by the Riverside City Council at the recommendation of the Cultural Heritage board.
135		Riverside Main Library (3581 Mission Inn Avenue)				
136	Upload image	Gore Manor (2530 Prince Albert Dr.)				This home was built in 1932 By Garrett Beekman Van Pelt Jr., a Fellow of the AIA for Thomas Gore, a prominent Riverside citrus grower, banker civic leader and community advocate promoting Riversides citrus industry and building international relationships helping establish Sendai Japan as Riversides sister city. Designated by Riverside Cultural Heritage Board Landmark no 136
137		Bigelow's Bungalow (4625 Glenwood Drive)				
138		E. T. Wall Packing House (3280 Vine Street)				
139		The Harbor (3014 Pine Street)				
140	Upload image	Farm House Motel (1393 University Avenue)				
141		Freelander Tractor Co. Showroom (3252 Mission Inn Avenue)				
142		E. T. Wall Packing House #2 (3230 Vine Street)				
143		David S. Bell House (4428 Houghton Avenue)				
144	Upload image	Neblett Residence (6744 Oleander Court)				
145	Upload image	Woolley Residence (5050 Myrtle Avenue)				
146	Upload image	Powell-Wheeler Residence (3860 El Hijo Street)				
147		Walter Verly House (6268 Palm Avenue)				
148	Upload image	Lewis Residence (3881 Loring Drive)				
149	Upload image	Okubo Residence (2365 11th Street)				
150	Upload image	Mercantile Hall-Orange Valley Masonic Lodge #13 (2933 12th Street)				
151	Upload image	Boyd Residence (4649 9th Street)				
152		Riverside City Hall (3900 Main Street)				
153		Hays-Pattee House (3611 Mount Rubidoux Drive)				
154	Upload image	Lionhead (2881 Rumsey Drive)				
155	Upload image	Edie (5958 Edith Avenue)				

== Monuments and Memorials ==
Photo	Name/ location	Description
Upload image	Chinese pagoda (in front of the downtown library)	
Upload image	Famous Flyers Wall (Mission Inn)	
Upload image	Huntington shrine (Mount Rubidoux)	
	Junípero Serra cross (Mount Rubidoux)	
Upload image	Loring shrine (Mount Rubidoux)	
Upload image	Statue of Ahn Chang Ho (Main Street Pedestrian Mall)	
	Statue of Juan Bautista De Anza (Magnolia Ave at Fourteenth St)	See city landmark #73.
Upload image	Statue of Martin Luther King Jr. (Main Street Pedestrian Mall)	
Upload image	Statue of Mahatma Gandhi (Main Street Pedestrian Mall)	
Upload image	Statue of Ysmael R. Villegas (Main Street Pedestrian Mall)	
Upload image	The Riverside Tripod 1976 by artist James Rosati	This James Rosati sculpture was originally installed on the grounds of the newly constructed Riverside City Hall in Downtown Riverside. The sculpture was moved to the city's fire station #5, and re-dedicated on September 11, 2008, to the Riverside firefighters who responded to the 9/11 emergency in New York in 2001.
Upload image	Victims Wall (Victim's Courtyard in downtown Riverside)	
	World Peace Bridge (Mount Rubidoux)	
Upload image	World War II Water Buffalo Tank (Fairmount Park)	The FMC corporation, originally the Food Machinery Company, and a maker of citrus packing equipment and pesticides, was given a contract to design a tracked military vehicle, after it had been instrumental in designing an amphibious tracked vehicle for use in the Florida Everglades. The Riverside plant became associated with the LVTA (landing vehicle, tracked, armored), or Water Buffalo. One of the tanks was installed on a cement pedestal at Fairmount Park as a memorial to the fact that the park's Lake Evans, along with the nearby Santa Ana River, were used as testing areas for the tank.

== Natural Landmarks ==
Photo	Name/ location	Description
Upload image	Arlington Mountain	1,853 feet (565 m); 33°52′16.97″N 117°28′17.36″W
	Box Springs Mountain	3,080 feet (940 m); 33°57′42″N 117°16′49″W
Upload image	La Sierra Hills	
Upload image	Little Pachapa Hill	877 feet (267 m); 33°57′2.63″N 117°22′55.38″W
	Mount Rubidoux	1,399 feet (426 m); 33°59′1.39″N 117°23′35.23″W
	Pachapa Hill	1,186 feet (361 m); 33°57′37.94″N 117°22′49.73″W
Upload image	Quarry Hill	1,178 feet (359 m); 33°55′23.30″N 117°23′35.38″W
	Santa Ana River	
Upload image	Tequesquite Arroyo	
Upload image	Victoria Hill	1,005 feet (306 m); 33°57′33.88″N 117°22′14.27″W

== Other Historic Sites ==
Photo	Name/ location	Description				
	Giant Lily Cup (Iowa Ave north of Palmyrita Ave)	The world's largest "paper" cup in front of what was once the Lily-Tulip manufacturing company, later Sweetheart Cup Company. Actually made of poured concrete, the cup stands about 68.1 feet (20.8 m) tall.				
Upload image	Main Street Mall Clock Tower and Water Fall (Tenth and Main Streets)					
	Main Street Pedestrian Mall Antique Clock Tower (southwest corner of Mission Inn Ave and Main St)	A 13 foot high Seth Thomas street clock made in 1908. Originally the clock was installed on Riverside's Main Street in the 1920s in front of the Fisher Jewelry store. The clock was moved several times along with the store. Fisher reportedly obtained the clock from someone in Pasadena, California, where the clock had also stood in front of a jewelry store. The clock was completely refurbished in 2010, and moved to its current location, as part of the Main Street Pedestrian Mall remodel.				
	Concrete Railway Viaduct (crossing the Santa Ana River near Fremont St)	When built in 1903 it was billed as the largest concrete viaduct in the world. It is 984 feet (300 m) long, 17 feet (5.2 m) wide, averages 55 feet (17 m) in height, and contains about 14,000 cubic feet (400 m^{3}) of concrete. (As a comparison, Glenfinnan Viaduct (the "Harry Potter" viaduct) was built in 1901 and is 1,035 feet (315 m) long and up to 100 feet (30 m) high.)				
	University of California, Riverside Bell Tower and Carillon	The 161 feet (49 m) bell tower houses a 48-bell carillon with bells ranging from 28 pounds to 5,091 pounds. Regular performances are held weekly, on Mondays, from noon until 1:00pm, with special performances throughout the year.				
	Upload image	Citrus Experiment Station	28	CPHI		
	Upload image	Citrus Machinery Pioneering	30	CPHI		
	Upload image	De Anza Crossing of the Santa Ana River Site		787		In 1774 and 1775 Juan Bautista de Anza lead two expeditions through the area that would become the city of Riverside. Markers identify the location his party crossed the Santa Ana River. On the south side of the river, within the city of Riverside, a marker can be found in the Martha McLean – Anza Narrows Park. On the opposite side of the river, a marker can be found at 6161 Moraga Ave in the city of Jurupa Valley.
	Upload image	Masonic Temple (3650 11th St)			80000832	
	Upload image	Riverside-Arlington Heights Fruit Exchange (3391 Mission Inn Ave)			80000833	
		Sutherland Fruit Company (3191 Mission Inn Ave)			86000732	
	Upload image	March Field Historic District (Eschscholtzia Ave)		CPHI	94001420	

== Tallest buildings in Riverside ==
Rank	Name	Street Address	Height	Floors	Year	Use
1	Riverside County Administration Building	4080 Lemon St.	196 feet (60 m)	14	1974	Government
2	Mount Rubidoux Manor	3993 10th St.	166 feet (51 m)	16	1971	Residential
3	University of California, Riverside, Carillon Tower	900 University Ave.	161 feet (49 m)	NA	1966	Performing Arts
4	Regency Tower	10th St. and Orange St.	155 feet (47 m)	10	2009	Office
5	Robert Presley Detention Center	4000 Orange St.	135 feet (41 m)	13	1989	Government
6	Marriott Hotel Riverside	3400 Market St.	127 feet (39 m)	12	1987	Hotel
7	California Tower	3737 Main St.		11		Office
8	First Congregational Church of Riverside	3504 Mission Inn Ave.	125 feet (38 m)		1914	Church
9	4075 Main Street	4075 Main St.		9		Office
10	Riverside Centre	3403 Tenth St.		8	1982	Office
11	University Village Towers	3500 Iowa Ave.		8	2005	Residential
12	Humanities and Social Sciences Building - UCR	900 University Ave.		7	1963	School
13	Plymouth Tower	3401 Lemon St.		7	1970	Residential
14	Riverside City Hall	3900 Main St.		7	1975	Government
15	Riverside Metro Center	3801 University Ave.		7	1990	Office
16	Sierra Towers, La Sierra University	4500 Riverwalk Pkwy.		7	1968	Residential
17	Central Plaza	3590 Central Ave.		6	1969	Office
18	Mission Inn	3649 Mission Inn Ave.		6	1932	Hotel
19	Riverside Hall of Justice	4100 Main St.		6		Government

=== Proposed ===
Proposed new buildings in Riverside:

Rank	Name	Street Address	Height feet	Floors	Year
1	Riverside Community Hospital	4445 Magnolia Ave.		9	Proposed—Construction to begin in 2011
2	Riverside Office Building	Main St. and University Ave.		6 to 8	Proposed
3	Citrus Tower	Lime St. and University Ave.		6	Under Construction

== See also ==
- List of museums in Riverside, California
- California Historical Landmarks in Riverside County, California
- List of Riverside County, California, placename etymologies
- List of California Historical Landmarks
- National Register of Historic Places listings in California
- List of National Historic Landmarks in California
- List of National Natural Landmarks in California
