= Svend Nielsen =

Svend Nielsen may refer to:

- Svend Nielsen (composer)
- Svend Nielsen (architect)
- Svend Nielsen (footballer)
- Svend Nielsen (wrestler)
- Svend Otto Nielsen, Danish resistance fighter during World War II

== See also ==
- Sven Nielsen
