= Fairmount Park (Riverside, California) =

Park in California, United States

- The lake at Fairmount Park.
- Interactive map of Fairmount Park
- Type: Urban park
- Location: Riverside, California, United States
- Coordinates: 33.997°N 117.375°W
- Area: 250 acres (100 ha)
- Designer: Olmsted Brothers
- Status: Open

Riverside Landmark
- Reference no.: 69

Fairmount Park is a park in Riverside, California, designated by the Riverside Cultural Heritage Board as Landmark No. 69. The park's band shell, designed in 1920 by Mission-style architect Arthur Burnett Benton, is separately designated as Landmark No. 10. The park is located at 2601 Fairmount Boulevard, and lies SouthEast of the Santa Ana River with Route 60 to the North.

The California Office of Environmental Health Hazard Assessment has issued a safe eating advisory for any fish caught in Lake Evans, in the Western portion of the park, due to elevated levels of mercury and PCBs. In addition, there is a notice of "DO NOT EAT" for Catfish.

== History ==
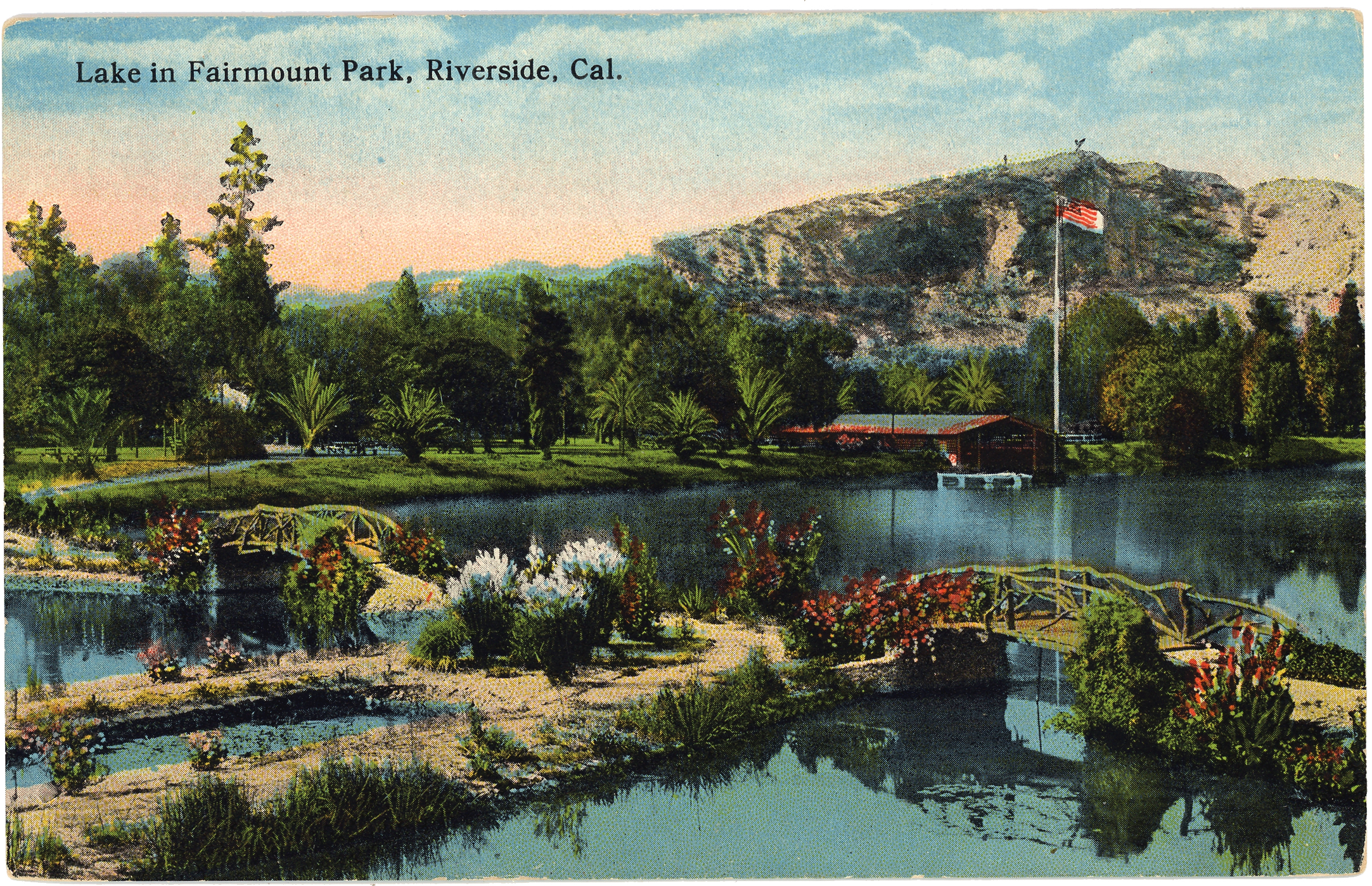
Fairmount Park in vintage postcard image c. 1916

The firm Olmsted and Olmsted was commissioned in 1911 to design Fairmount Park. Although Frederick Law Olmsted, who designed New York City's Central Park, had died in 1903, his design principles were evident in his sons' planning of Fairmount Park. The primary design aspects of the park were implemented over the following 13 years, ending in 1924 with Lake Evans. In 1985, a tree inventory showed that many of the trees in the reforesting effort from 1911 were still living.

== Rehabilitation and revitalization ==
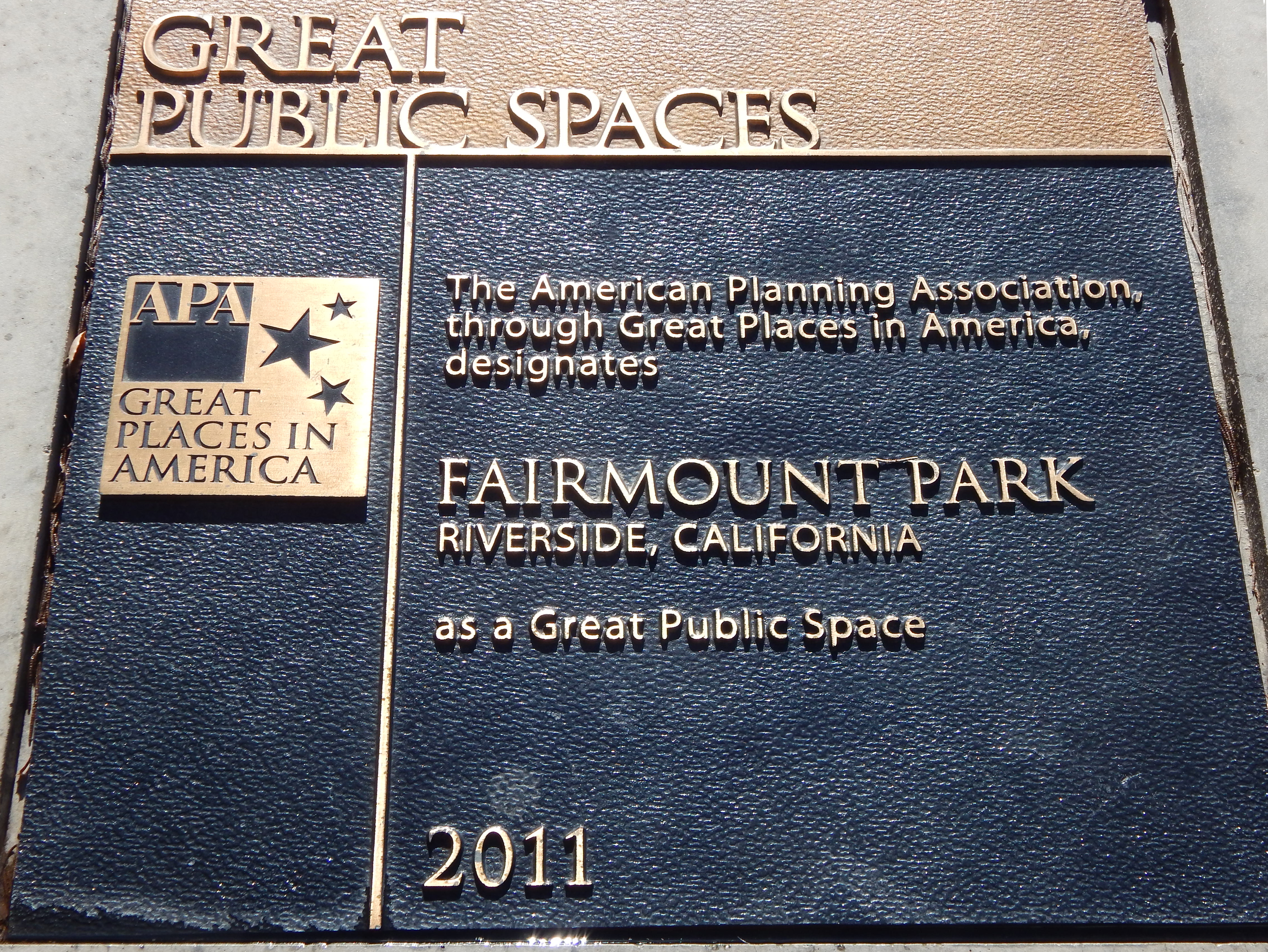
APA Great Public Spaces plaque, Fairmount Park, 2011

Rehabilitation of the park was prompted by flooding and deterioration of Lake Evans and the increase in crime in and nearby the park. The revitalization was championed by local residents such as Pat Stewart, current chair of Friends of Fairmount Park. The rehabilitation efforts began in 2001 with volunteers willing to pick up waste or provide other general maintenance needs for the park. Community effort catalyzed funding for a $2.6 million playground.

In 2011, the American Planning Association (APA) designated Fairmount Park as a "Great Public Space", one of ten so designated. Also in 2011, the City Parks Alliance (Washington, D.C.) designated the park as a "Frontline Park", calling it a "jewel . . . in the region's park system".

== Amenities ==
Fairmount Park offers a golf course, two tennis courts, public barbecues,kayaking, boat rentals (including pedal boats that are handicap accessible), sailing and fishing on Lake Evans, running, jogging and walking on the Santa Ana River Trail, a number of exercise classes held in the park, and the playground. It also has a well maintained lawn bowling court which first opened in the 1920s, and a Rose Garden with a gazebo which is a popular location for photographs of significant community events.

The rose garden and gazebo at Fairmount Park.

== Memorial installations ==
Union Pacific Engine No. 6051 was placed at the park's formal entrance on Market Street in 1954, to commemorate the 50th anniversary of the arrival of the railroad in Riverside. In 1949, the American Legion installed a Water Buffalo amphibious tank on a ramp going down into Lake Evans, to commemorate Riverside's role in the manufacture of the vehicle during World War II.

== Gallery ==
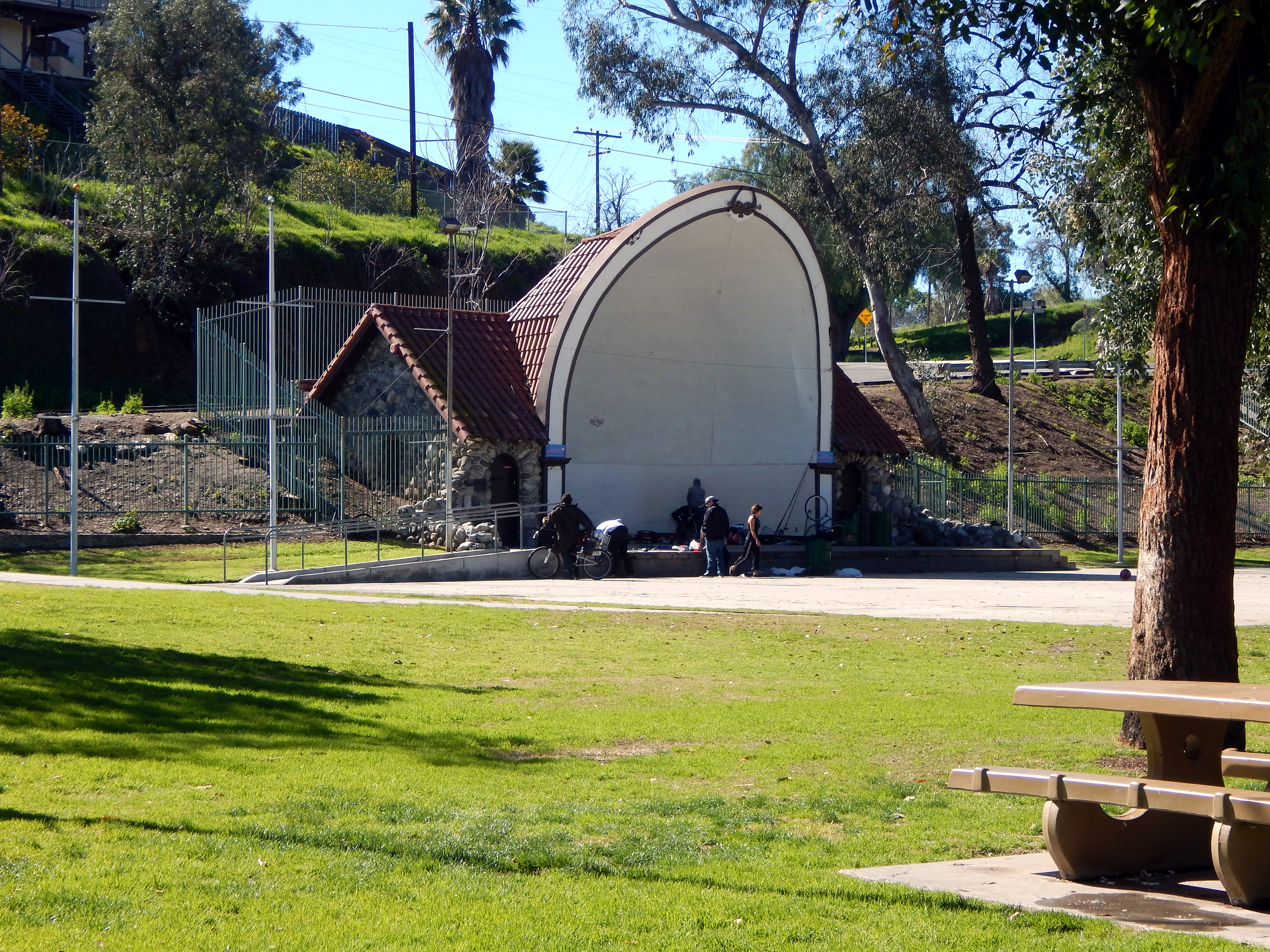
Band shell (1920, rebuilt 1995), Landmark No. 10

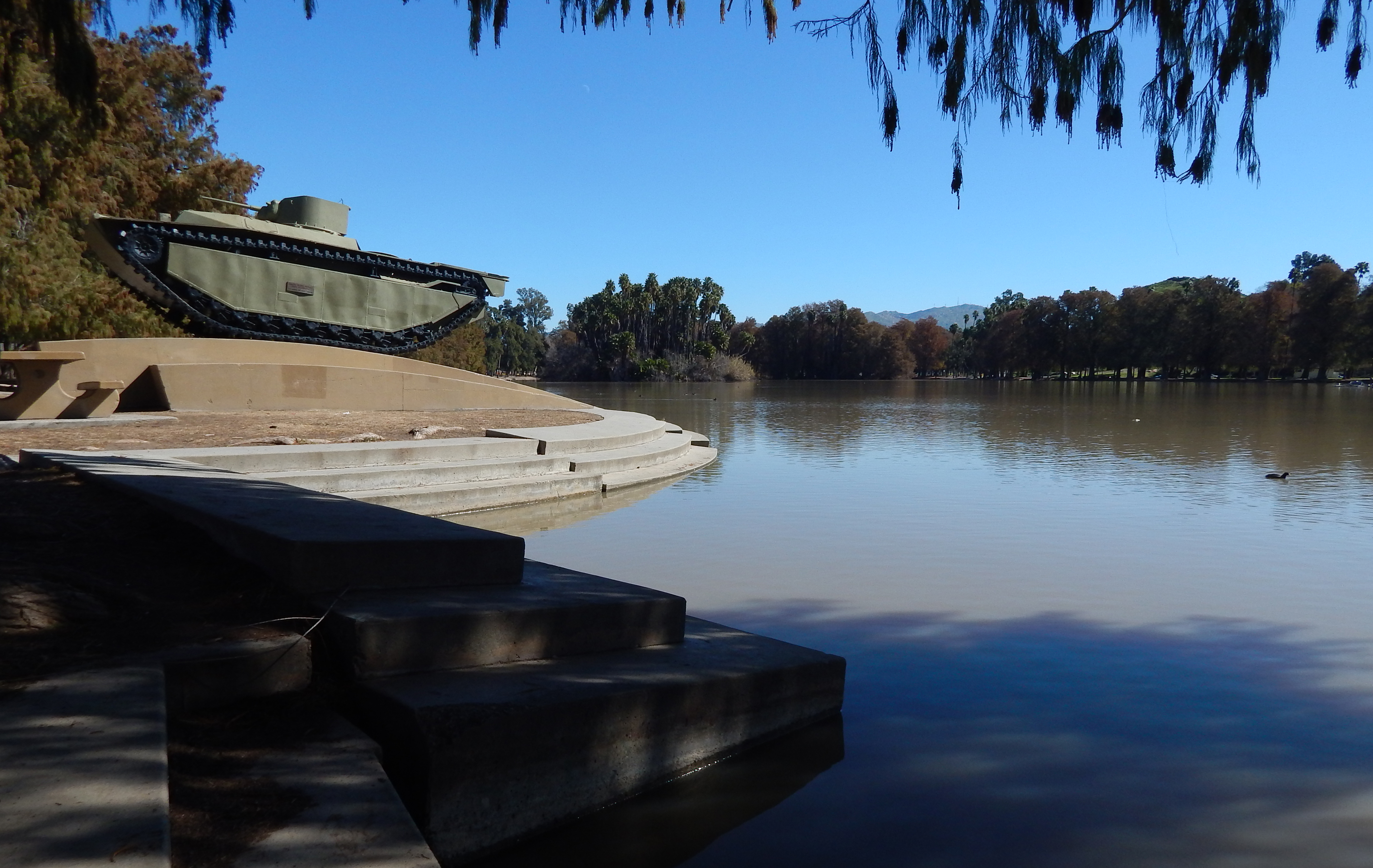
"Famous Water Buffalo" World War II amphibious vehicle

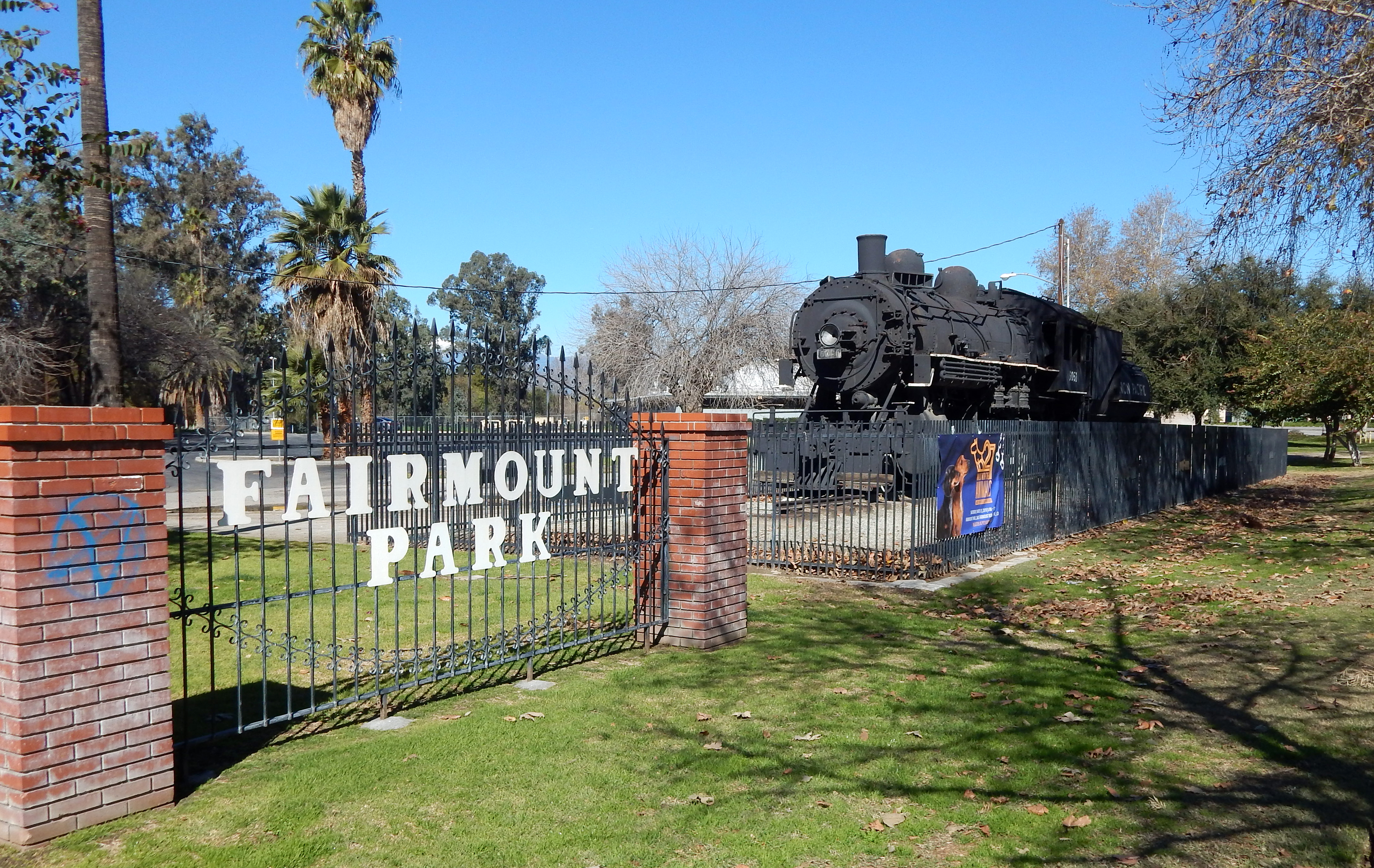
Park's formal entrance on Market Street, with Union Pacific locomotive

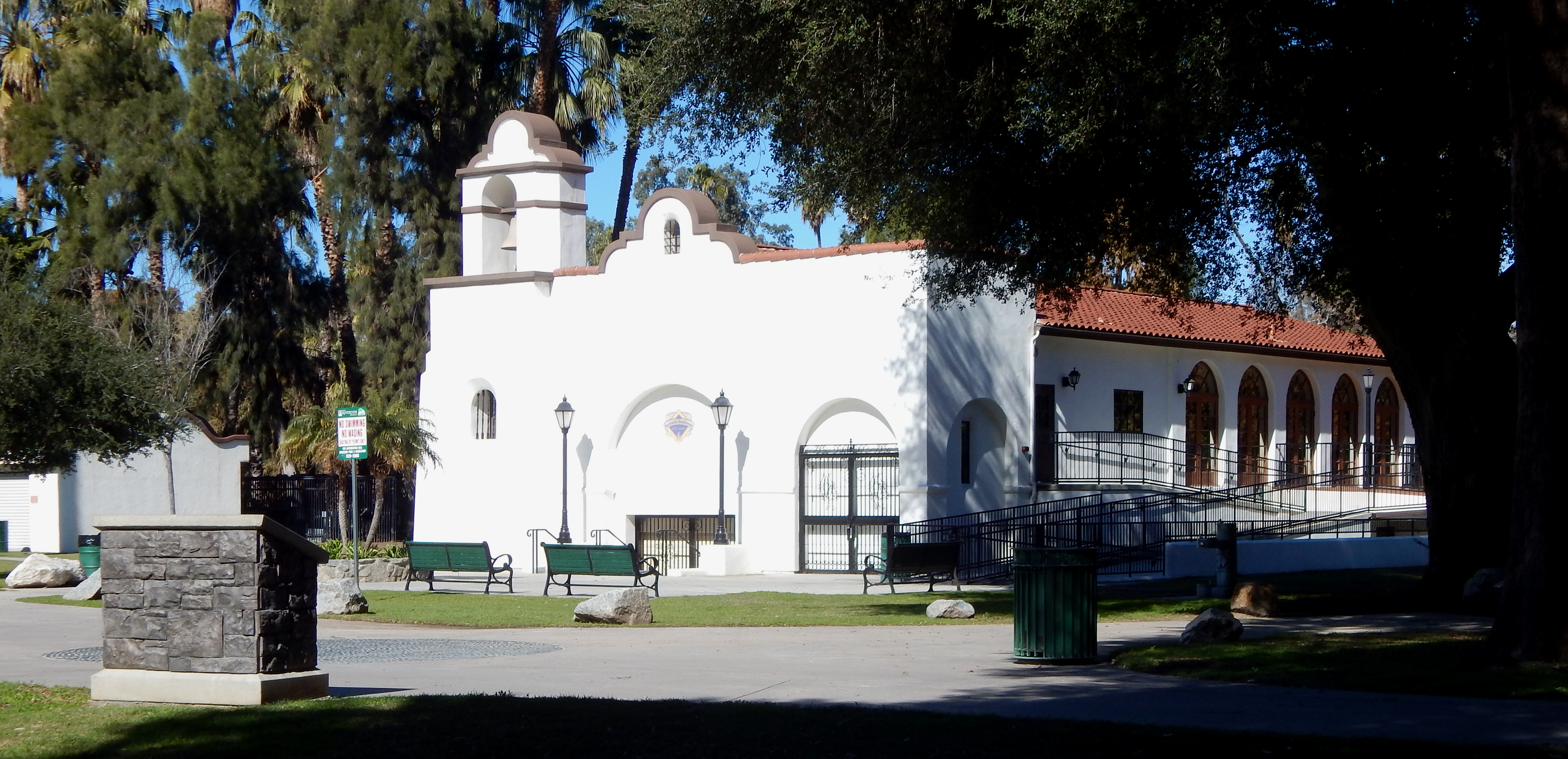
Stewarts Boathouse (1912)

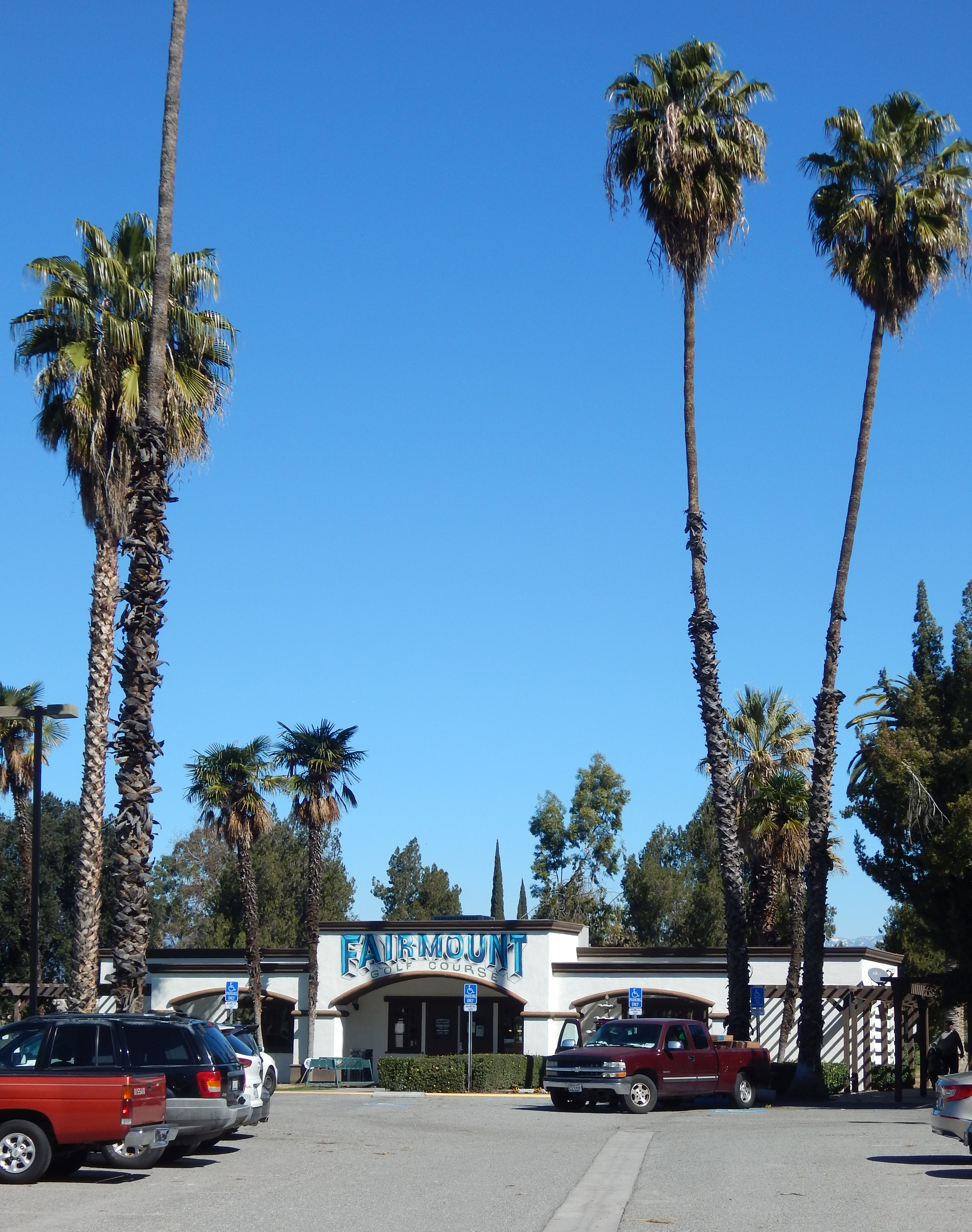
Fairmount Golf Course clubhouse
