= Discovery Cube Orange County =

Science museum in Santa Ana, California

Coordinates: 33°46′12.7″N 117°52′4.3″W

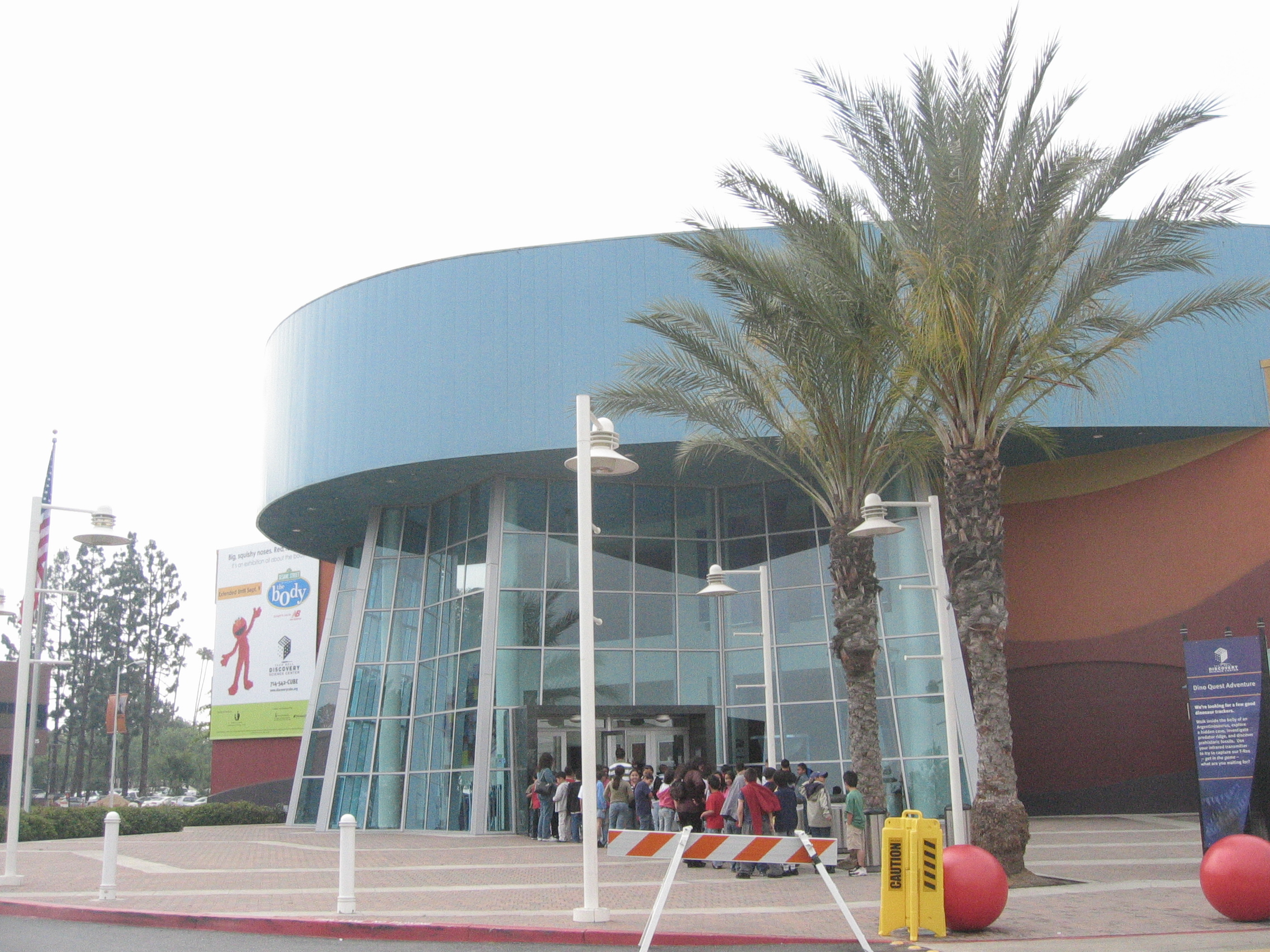
- Established: December 17, 1998; 27 years ago
- Location: Santa Ana, California, U.S.
- Visitors: 525,000 (2012)
- President: Joe Adams
- Website: DiscoveryCube.org

The Discovery Cube Orange County, formerly known as the Discovery Science Center, Taco Bell Discovery Science Center, or simply The Cube, is a science museum in Santa Ana, California, with more than 100 hands-on science exhibits designed to spark children's natural curiosity. Designed by the architecture firm Arquitectonica with structural engineers Carl Johnson and Svend Nielsen, it has become a visual landmark due to its ten-story solar array cube that stands over Interstate 5.

== History ==
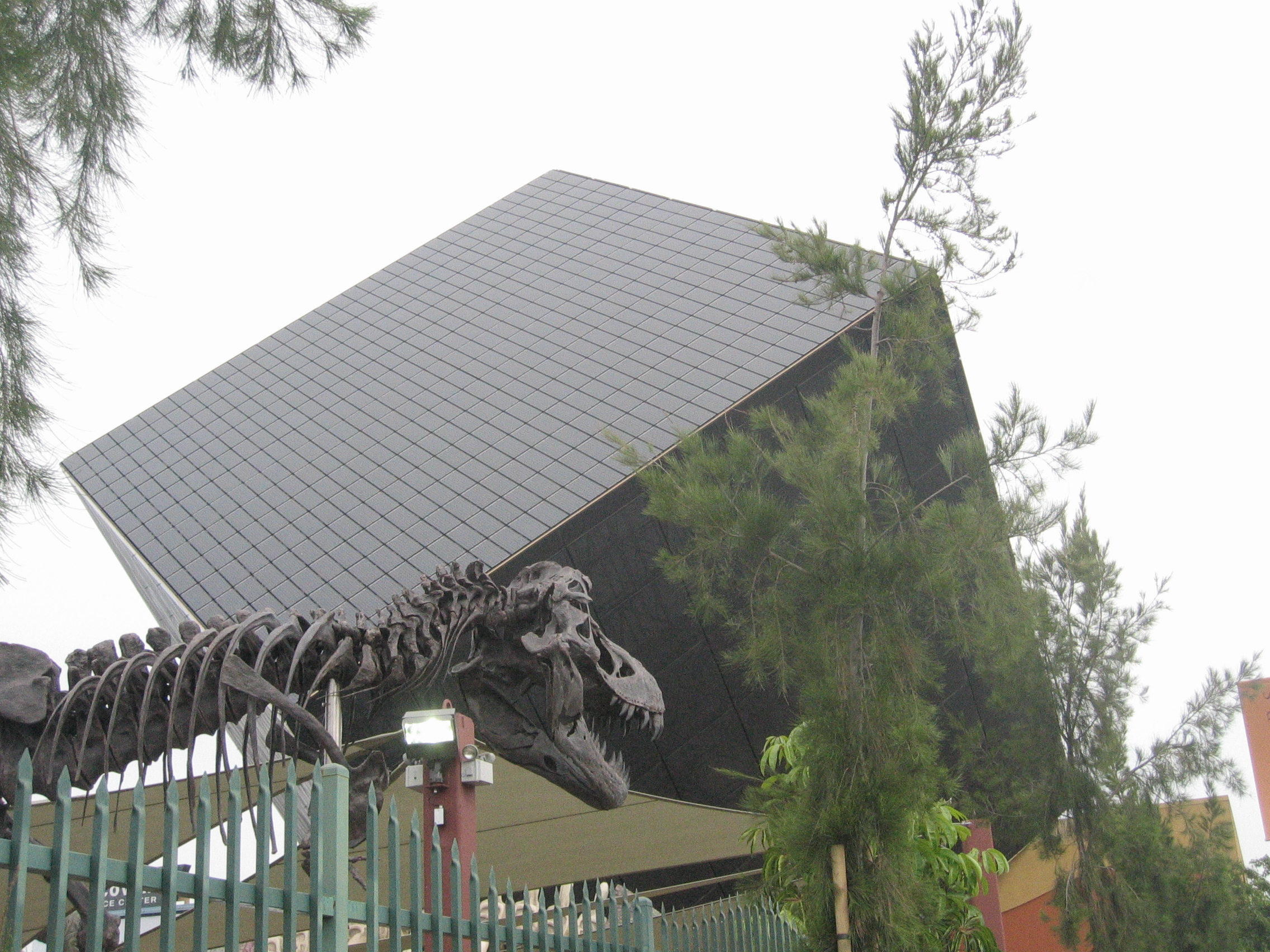
The center's solar cube

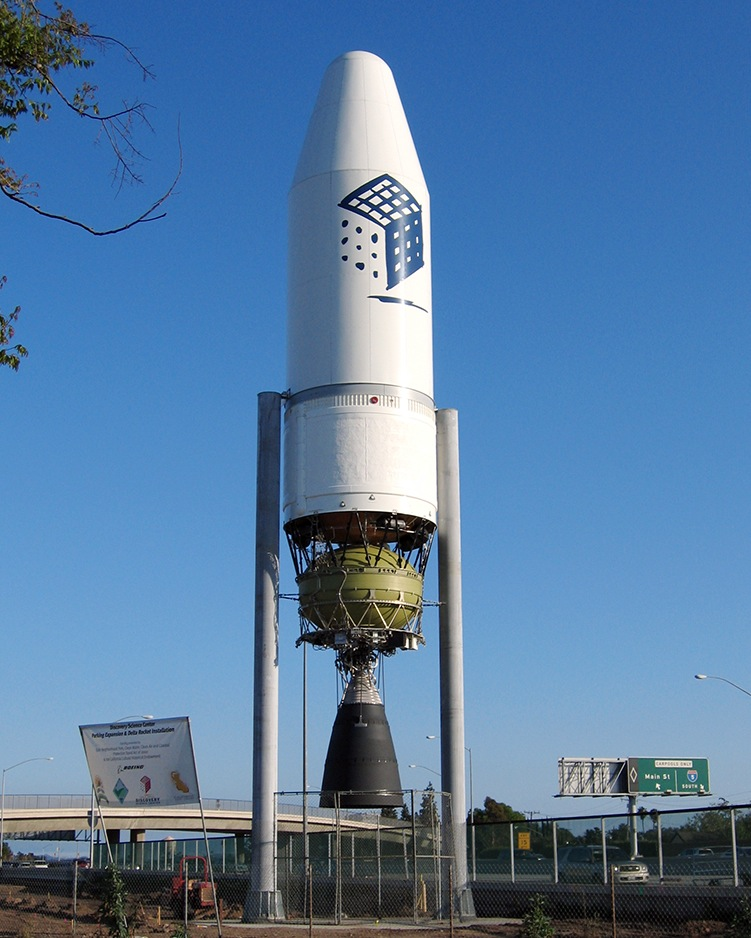
A donated DCSS rocket and RL 10B-2 engine outside the Center

In 1984, the Boards of the Exploratory Learning Center (now the Heritage Museum of Orange County) and the Experience Center joined to form the Discovery Museum of Orange County with the dual goals of teaching children what life was like in Orange County in the 1900s and creating a world-class science center. A funding feasibility study in 1989 indicated that county leaders would support the project. In the mid-1990s, prior to construction, a smaller "beta" version of the science center called Launch Pad operated in South Coast Plaza. The current 59,000-square-foot (5,500 m^{2}) facility was opened on December 17, 1998, in what had originally been a Bekins Van Lines depot. Mark Walhimer served as the Vice President of Exhibits from 1996 to 2000 and oversaw the design, development and installation of the exhibits. In 2008 the Center became an affiliate within the Smithsonian Affiliations program.

On September 29, 2012, it was announced that the center was seeking to expand its facilities. Phase 1, opened on June 11, 2015, features the new 40,000 sq ft (3,700 m^{2}) Discovery Pavilion and 4,000 sq ft (370 m^{2}) of remodeled space. Future phases include a Life Sciences Hall, Courtyard of Learning and Living, Environmental Pavilion, an IMAX theater, and a "green" parking facility.

=== Discovery Cube Los Angeles ===
The center has also entered into a partnership with the City of Los Angeles to take over and operate the former Children's Museum of Los Angeles facility at Hansen Dam, located in the northern San Fernando Valley. The city provided financing and contracted with the center in April 2012, and the center finalized federal funding in January 2013 to finish construction on the existing facility and begin building exhibits. The satellite campus opened on November 13, 2014, and is named Discovery Cube Los Angeles. This is also the site of the 1991 Rodney King beating.

== Exhibits ==
The center is divided into several themed areas: Science of Hockey, Dino Quest, Rocket Lab, Air & Space, Eco Challenge, Dynamic Earth, Quake Zone, and the Showcase Gallery which houses traveling exhibits. Some of the available exhibits at the museum include Dino Quest, an interactive work which opened in 2006 and includes life-size dinosaurs; and Science of Hockey, which opened in 2009 and presents the various scientific aspects behind the game of ice hockey with the help of the Anaheim Ducks franchise.
