= Children's Museum of Los Angeles =

Children's museum in California, United States (1979–2009)

Coordinates: 34.054°N 118.245°W

- Established: June 11, 1979
- Dissolved: April 17, 2009
- Location: Los Angeles, California, U.S.
- Type: Children's museum
- Visitors: 250,000 (2000)

The Children's Museum of Los Angeles opened to the public on June 11, 1979, and operated for 21 years. It was located at the Los Angeles Mall in the Los Angeles Civic Center. It specifically catered to children, with the purpose of educating, entertaining, and enriching children's lives in the greater Los Angeles area. It was modeled after the children's museums in Boston, Indianapolis and Brooklyn.

The museum featured a city street (with cars and motorcycles) with a sewer system that could be crawled through, Grandma's attic with wearable costumes, a large Lego play area, and a section called Sticky City consisting of large stuffed fabric blocks with Velcro that stuck to each other and could be used for building. There was also a TV studio where children could be camera operators or news anchors, a large photosensitive wall that would imprint shadows when a strobe light was set off, a workshop where visitors could make their own Zoetrope animations, and other activities.

== Closing and bankruptcy ==
Due to the need for space and access the museum's Board of Governors decided to close the museum on August 27, 2000, with the intention of creating two new facilities: one in Little Tokyo, Los Angeles, and another at the San Fernando Valley's Hansen Dam. The Little Tokyo facility was indefinitely postponed in October 2002, and while construction of the Hansen Dam facility was begun with bond money in October 2005, the non-profit running the museum was unable to raise sufficient funds to populate the interior.

The museum filed for bankruptcy on April 17, 2009, after investor Bruce Friedman had his assets frozen by a judge at the request of the U.S. Securities and Exchange Commission in March 2009, having accused him of stealing $17 million from investors. His donation of $10 million was subsequently withdrawn. The museum needed a further $22 million for construction to be completed. The city of Los Angeles had also invested over $10 million.

== Discovery Cube Los Angeles ==
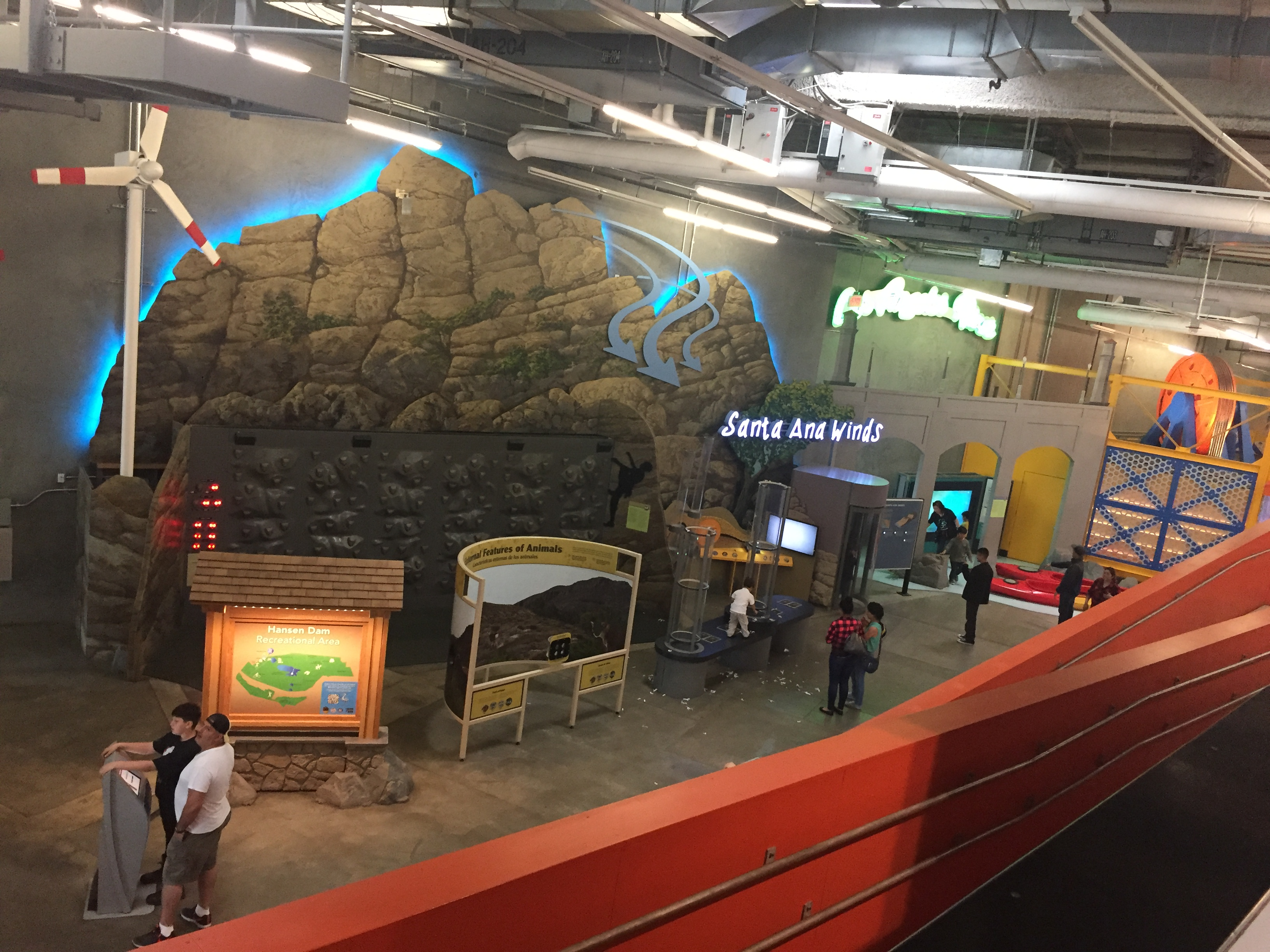
A look inside Discovery Cube, L.A.

The City of Los Angeles entered into a partnership with Discovery Cube Orange County to take over and operate the empty Hansen Dam facility. City funding was allocated in April 2012, and federal funding was approved in January 2013. This satellite campus, named Discovery Cube Los Angeles, opened on November 13, 2014.
