= Victoria Avenue (Riverside, California) =

- U.S. National Register of Historic Places
- Riverside Landmark
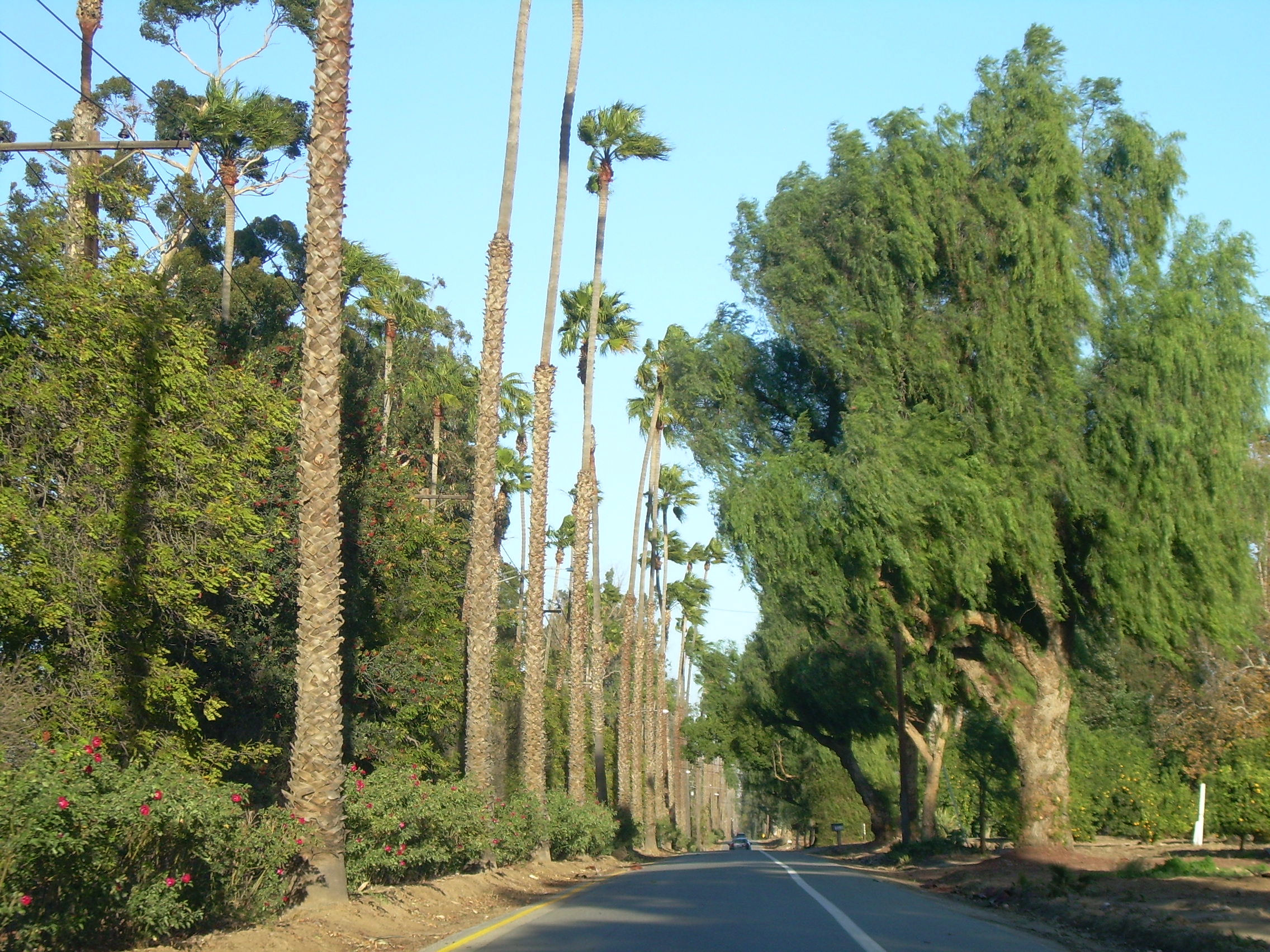
- Victoria Avenue, which bisects Riverside, hosts many species of trees and plants.
- Location: Victoria Ave., from Arlington Ave. to Boundary Ln., Riverside, California
- Coordinates: 33°55′33″N 117°23′57″W
- Area: 88.7 acres (35.9 ha)
- Built: 1892
- Architect: Hosp, Franz Philip
- NRHP reference No.: 00001267
- RIVL No.: 8
- Added to NRHP: October 26, 2000

Victoria Avenue is a divided scenic street in Riverside, California, that cuts through an area referred to as the greenbelt. Originally developed in 1892 to connect the Arlington Heights area to downtown Riverside, the road became a popular tourist attraction because to landscape the route. Beyond the landscaping, the road was surrounded by navel orange groves, the crop that spurred Riverside's growth. Many of the groves still exist today.
