= Heritage Museum of Orange County =

Museum in California

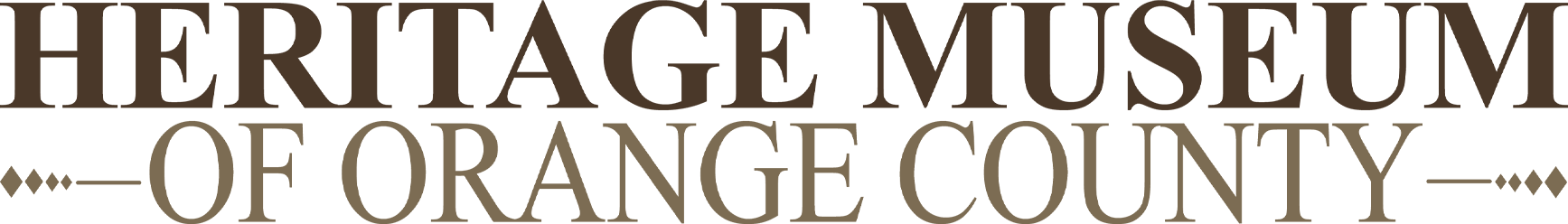

- Location within the Los Angeles metropolitan area Location within California Location within the United States
- Former names: Exploratory Learning Center; Discovery Museum of Orange County
- Established: 1981
- Location: 3101 W Harvard St, Santa Ana, CA 92704
- Coordinates: 33.7207°N 117.9106°W
- Type: Historical museum
- Visitors: 40,000
- Founder: Dr. Mary Nolan
- Executive director: Candace Chromy
- President: Patricia Shepherd
- Website: heritagemuseumoc.org

The Heritage Museum of Orange County, formerly the Exploratory Learning Center and the Discovery Museum of Orange County, is a historical museum in Santa Ana, California. In addition to being a museum, it also functions as an events center and educational program host. The museum's grounds, about 12 acres (4.9 ha) in total, contain historic buildings and receive 40,000 visitors annually.

== History ==
The museum has its roots in the early 1980s, with Dr. Mary Nolan, who worked in the Santa Ana Unified School District. She wanted to allow students to go on more field trips, but there were not enough funds to cover the fees to enter or the ones for the buses. Nolan's plan was to buy a historic house and relocate it to government-owned property for use in education. The Kellogg family donated their house and it was renovated and moved onto the property in 1979, eventually opening to visitors in 1985, although the official founding of the museum, then the Exploratory Learning Center, was in 1981. The Maag House was moved to the site in 1981. The museum was later renamed to the Discovery Museum of Orange County in 1985. From 1987 to 2001, the operators of the museum and the Discovery Cube Orange County (then the Discovery Science Center) merged, although they split and the Science Center was renamed in 2001. Also in 1987, the citrus grove and rose gardens were first planted.

The museum's blacksmith shop opened on February 16, 1994. It burned down from neighborhood fireworks on July 4, 2019, but was rebuilt through community donations and reopened on April 4, 2022. A mural honoring local figures was unveiled at the complex in June 2019.

== Exhibits ==
The H. Clay Kellogg House was built in 1898, and uses the Queen Anne architecture style. It is a popular site for school field trips. The 6,000 sq ft (560 m^{2}) John Maag Farmhouse, utilizing the Colonial Revival architecture style, was built in 1899. It houses a gift shop and offices. Other notable buildings include an operating blacksmith shop hosting the Orange County Blacksmith Guild, an adobe house, citrus groves, and an urban farm.
