= Mount Rubidoux Manor =

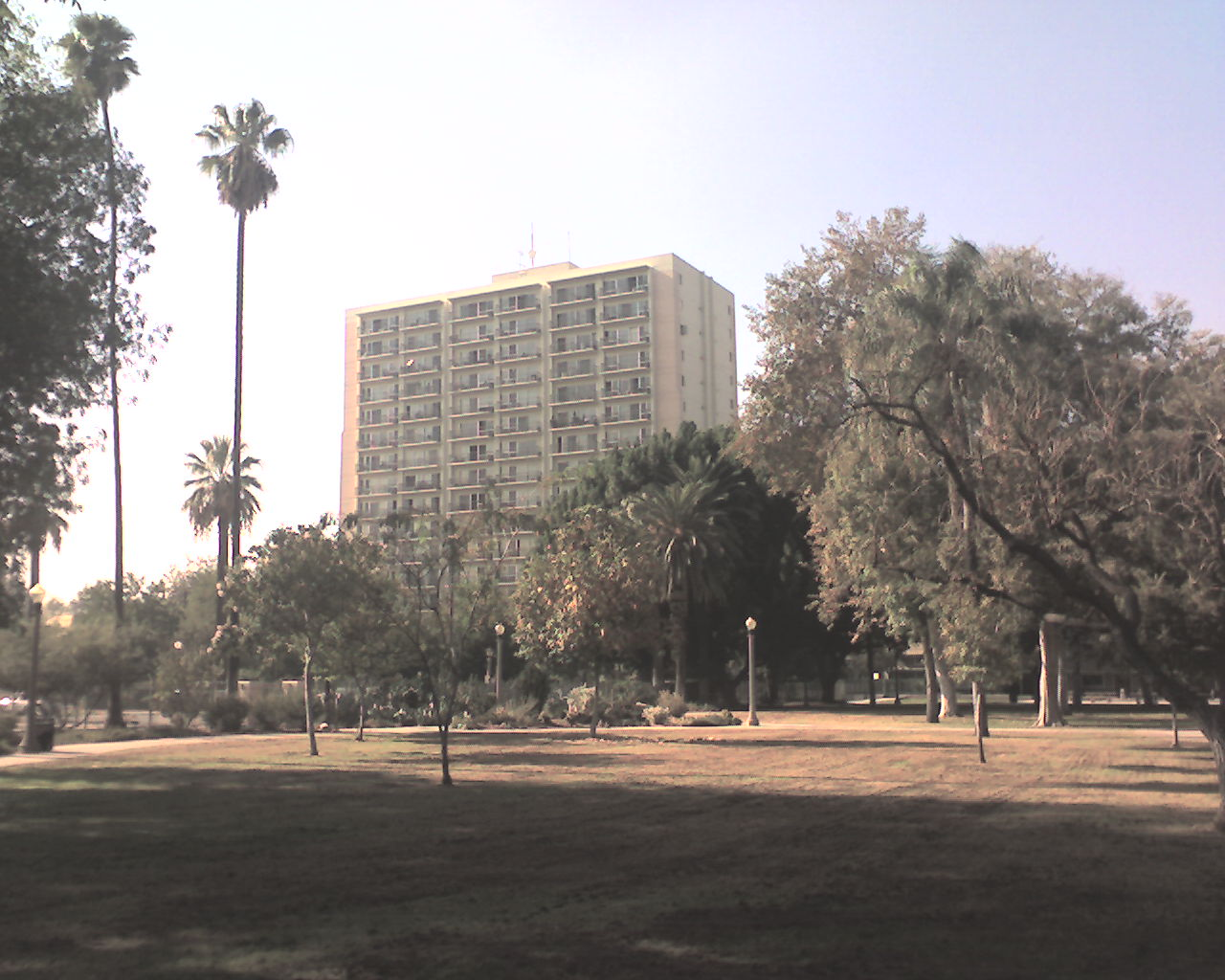
- Mount Rubidoux Manor.
- Interactive map of the Mount Rubidoux Manor area

General information
- Type: Senior Housing
- Location: 3993 10th Street; Riverside, California, USA
- Coordinates: 33.9817°N 117.3786°W
- Completed: 1971

Height
- Antenna spire: none
- Roof: 166 ft (51 m)

Technical details
- Floor count: 16

Design and construction
- Architect: Flewelling & Moody Architecture

The Mount Rubidoux Manor is a 16-story residential tower located in downtown Riverside, California. Built in 1971, the tower is used as senior housing by American Baptist Homes of the West (ABHOW). First Baptist Church of Riverside, one of the oldest churches in the city, raised the money to build the tower. The building is the tallest building in the City of Riverside.

== See also ==
- List of landmarks in Riverside, California
