= First Church of Christ, Scientist (Riverside, California) =

Historic church in California, United States

- U.S. National Register of Historic Places
- Riverside Landmark
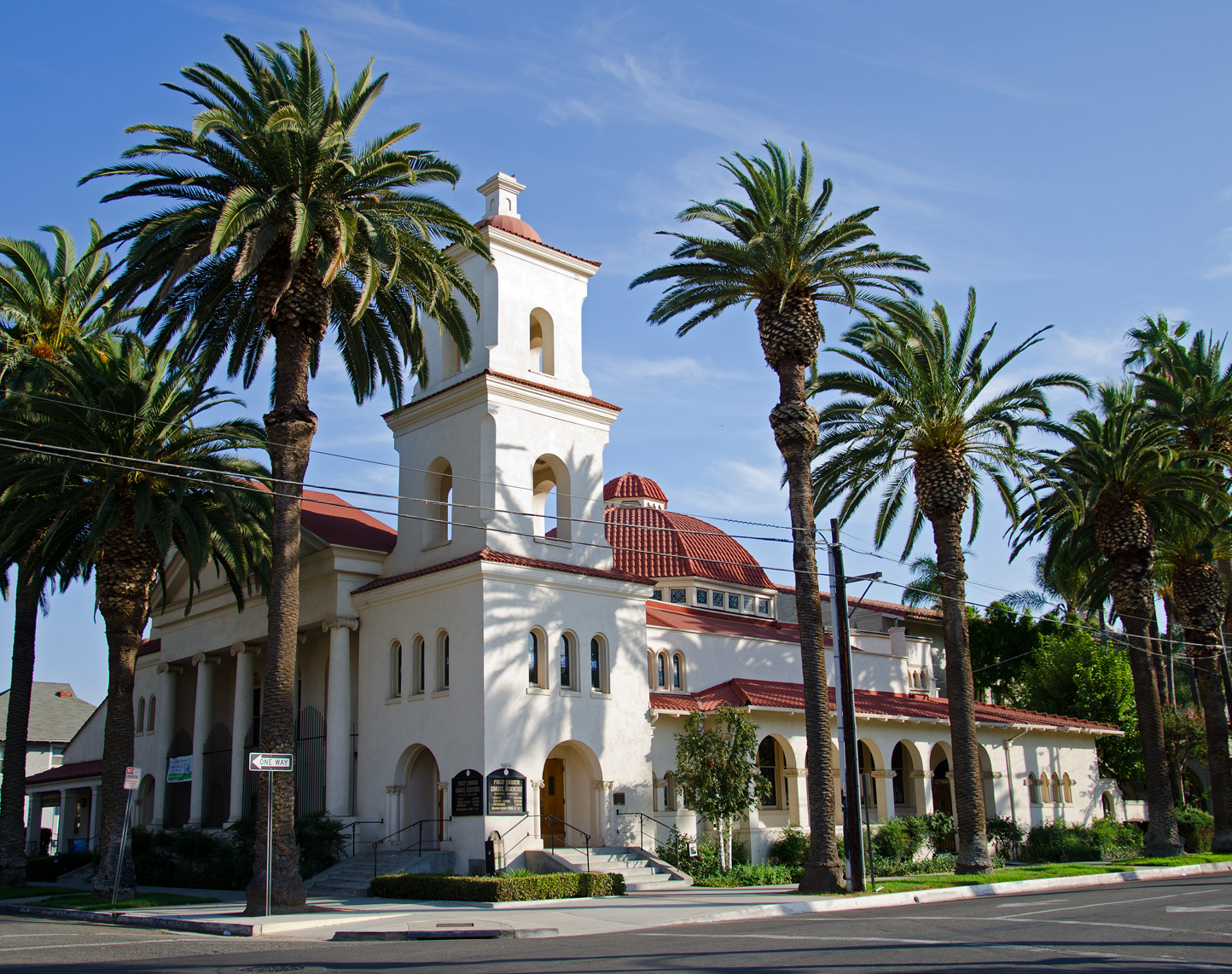

- Location within California Location within the United States
- Location: 3606 Lemon St., Riverside, California
- Coordinates: 33°58′57″N 117°22′14″W
- Built: 1901
- Architect: Arthur Burnett Benton; F.L. Spaulding
- Architectural style: Mission/Spanish Revival
- NRHP reference No.: 92001250
- RIVL No.: 7
- Added to NRHP: September 22, 1992

First Church of Christ, Scientist, built in 1901, is an historic Mission Revival-style Christian Science church located at 3606 Lemon Street in Riverside, California. It has been called: "the church that introduced Christian Science to Southern California." It was designed by noted Los Angeles architect Arthur Burnett Benton. On September 22, 1992, First Church of Christ, Scientist, was added to the National Register of Historic Places. It is still listed in the Christian Science Journal as an active Christian Science church.

Christian Science was founded by Mary Baker Eddy in 1866. October 24, 1900, was the occasion of the laying of the cornerstone for First Church of Christ, Scientist, Riverside. Notice of completion of the construction of the building was filed February 10, 1901. The dedication and first regular Sunday service were held on February 24 of that year.

Christian Science had actually been publicly introduced in Riverside some nine years previous, and the Christian Science Journal for October 1891 has listed: “Regular Sunday Services of Scientists.” They met in the home of Emma Stanton Davis, a student of Mrs. Eddy, who had moved to Riverside in 1887 and began healing work. Records in the Archives of the Mother Church in Boston, Massachusetts, show that Riverside was the first location in California where a class-taught student lived.

The architectural style of this church is primarily Mission Revival due to the influence of the renowned architect, Arthur Benton. Just one block from the church is Benton's Mission Inn, which is internationally known. He also designed the Riverside Municipal Auditorium which borders on the south end of the church property. The interior of the church was designed in the craftsman tradition with natural or lightly stained wood, with vertical and horizontal beams exposed. In the 1950s, all wood and ceiling rafters were covered and painted white with a blue decoration. This reflects a more classical tradition which may have been preferred by the congregation.
