= Masonic Temple (Riverside, California) =

- U.S. National Register of Historic Places
- Location within California Location within the United States
- Location: 3650 11th St., Riverside, California
- Coordinates: 33°58′43″N 117°22′30″W
- Area: 0.1 acres (0.040 ha)
- Built: 1908
- Architect: Burnham, Franklin P.
- Architectural style: Classical Revival
- NRHP reference No.: 80000832
- Added to NRHP: June 6, 1980

The Masonic Temple was a historic building in Riverside, California. Constructed in the Classical Revival style in 1908, it served as a Masonic Hall for two local Masonic Lodges. When the Masons moved to new premises in 1955, the building was purchased by Riverside County.

It was listed on the National Register of Historic Places in 1980. It was demolished in 1988 to make way for the new Riverside County Hall of Justice.
