= Nielsen Pool House =

Riverside City Landmark #134

Coordinates: 33°57′35.04″N 117°21′36.83″W

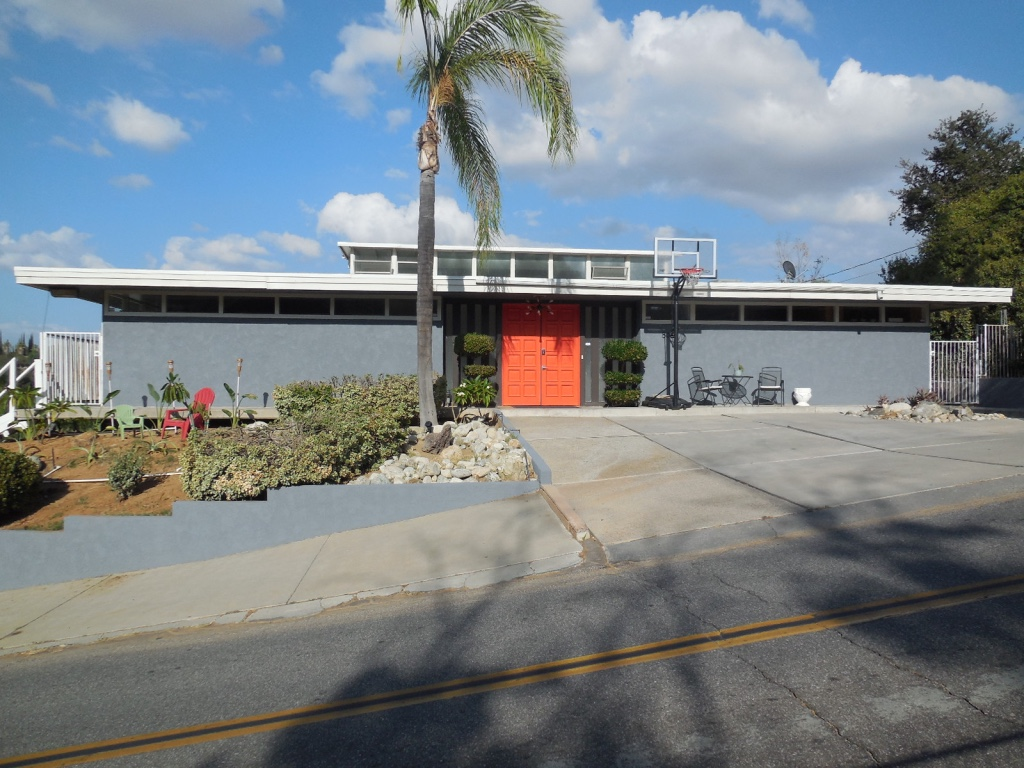

The Nielsen Pool House is Riverside City Landmark #134, the former residence of noted architectural engineer Svend Nielsen. The home was designed and engineered by Nielsen, who began construction in 1964. Nielsen and his family resided in the home from its completion in 1966 until 1988. Nielsen and his wife were immigrants from Denmark and the home is quintessentially representative of Mid-Century Modern architecture. As a representation of Mid-Century Modern Architecture, the home features ribbon windows, soffit lighting, built in units, a flat roof and multiple sputnik light fixtures.

== History and architecture ==
The most impressive feature of the home is the indoor swimming pool (hence the name "Nielsen Pool House"). The swimming pool room is atrium style and features expansive windows. The pool room is central to the design of the home with the bedrooms and bathrooms and living areas having direct access to the pool. The room is 2000 square feet, with the 15'x40' swimming pool located in the center. The ceiling over the pool is approximately 18' high and features retractable 10' foot sliding panels on tracks, which allow the roof to be opened to the sky. The back wall of the room consists of floor to ceiling windows and a sliding glass door which leads out to a wrap around deck and overlooks the lake on the 12th hole of the Victoria Country Club Golf course. According to Svend's son, Jack Nielsen, the enclosure of the swimming pool was not original to the home but was always a planned feature and was completed in approximately 1971.

In addition to the architectural significance of the swimming pool room, the home is built onto a slope with the latter fourth of the foundation suspended by concrete pillars 20 feet above grade. The slope itself was tiered at the time of construction, featuring trees and plants that offered over 50 varieties of fruit and vegetables, including citrus and avocado, however, much of this was allowed to die due to lack of adequate irrigation. The living area of the home is essentially one story with an additional bedroom and three car garage as a walkout basement underneath the home built out from the slope.

The interior of the home is listed on county records as 2,880 square feet, however, taped measurements come in at 3,342 square feet. The home features a large living room, family room, dining room, 6 bedrooms (including the walkout bedroom adjacent the garage) and four bathrooms. The area of the swimming pool room is not included in the home's living area.

Svend Nielsen sold the home in 1988, whereupon it changed hands several times until being acquired in 1995. The home was in poor condition at this time and expansive renovations were done in 1980's-1990's style, including new windows, stucco, and interior finishes such as white and green ceramic tile. In 2015, the home was purchased by the Cloake family, who remodeled the home in a style consistent with its Mid Century Modern heritage. Renovations included new paint, landscape and interior finishes, including wood floors and natural slate. In some cases, the original home finishes were able to be salvaged, such as the original VAT in the dining room and original subway tile in all the restrooms (tile had been left under newer tile installed in 1995). As a result of their renovation efforts, the Cloake's were awarded a Renovation Award by the Old Riverside Foundation in 2016. The home was the first mid-century modern home to receive an award in the history of the old Riverside Foundation.

On September 13, 2016, the Riverside City council voted unanimously to name the home a Riverside City Landmark (#134); The Nielsen Pool House due to its significance in being designed and built by Svend Nielsen as well as its representation of Mid Century Modern architecture.
