= Svend Nielsen (architect) =

Danish architect

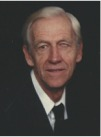
- Born: 1919
- Died: 2013 (aged 93–94)
- Occupations: Architect, Architectural engineer

Svend Nielsen (1919–2013) was a Danish born architect and architectural engineer. Nielsen with his partner, Carl Johnson, founded the firm Johnson and Nielsen. Nielsen was influential in the construction of many important structures in Southern California, including the Discovery Cube in Orange County, the Coussoulis Arena in San Bernardino (notable for its "spider-like" exterior frame work) and, most famously, the Forum in Inglewood, CA, which was the first structure of its kind to be built without support pillars. The engineering of the Forum was quite a feat as the structural design allowed no obstructed seats in the entire arena.

Within the City of Riverside, three separate structures have been declared City Landmarks, including the Set Free Thrift Store on 14th Street, the Riverside Office Supply Store on 14th Street (refaced in 2013) and a garage on Market Street (demolished for redevelopment in 2012). All of these structures feature Mid Century Modern style architecture that was indicative of Nielsen's Danish influences.

Nielsen also designed and engineered the Danish Lutheran Church and Cultural Center located in Yorba Linda, California, the Bachelor Quarters for the U.S. Naval base in Long Beach and over 5,000 other buildings.

In addition to his work in architecture and engineering, Nielsen was one of the founding members of the California Seismic Review Board, which would generate the guidelines that would later become the foundation for Chapter 34, of the existing building and structures code.

Most recently, Nielsen's own home in Riverside, California has been named a City of Riverside City of Riverside Landmark (City of Riverside Landmark #134). The unique home, fully designed and constructed by Nielsen himself, was completed in 1966 and is considered to be quintessentially representative of Mid Century Modern Architecture. Built on to a slope overlooking a lake on the 12th hole of the Victoria Country Club Golf Course, the home features large concrete columns, some as high as 20 feet, which support the home above the slope. However, the most notable feature of the home is its design, in which it is built entirely around an indoor swimming pool. The swimming pool room is over 2,000 square feet and features 20' tall ceilings and a retractable roof that opens to the sky.

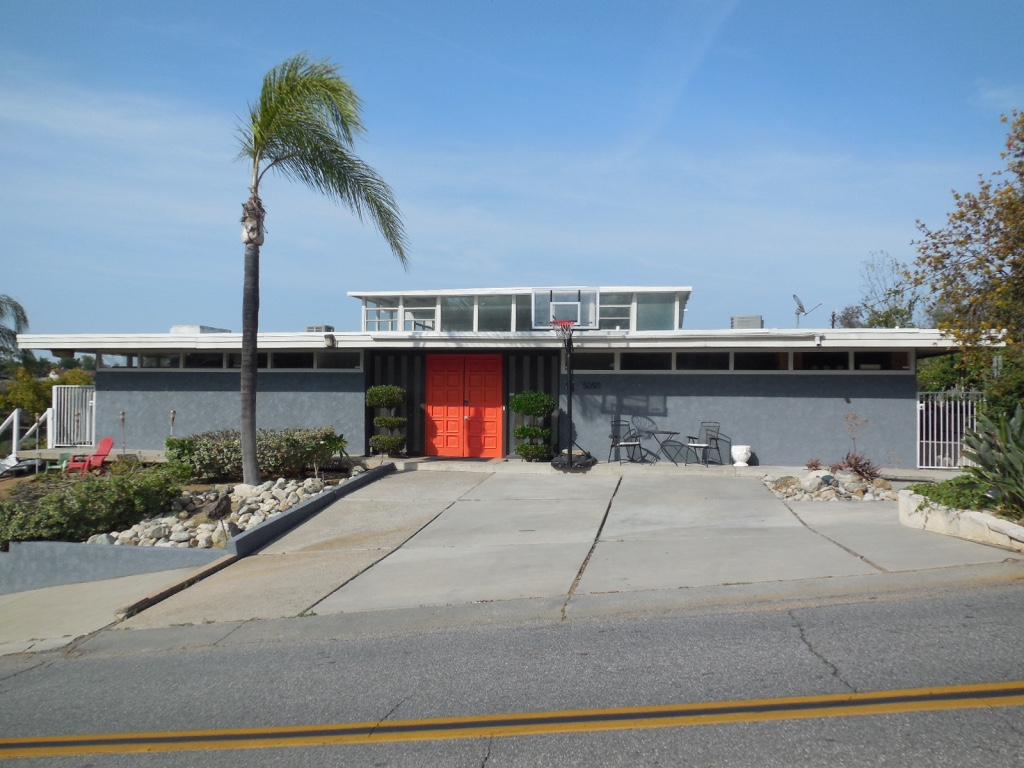
