= Arthur Burnett Benton =

American architect (1858–1927)

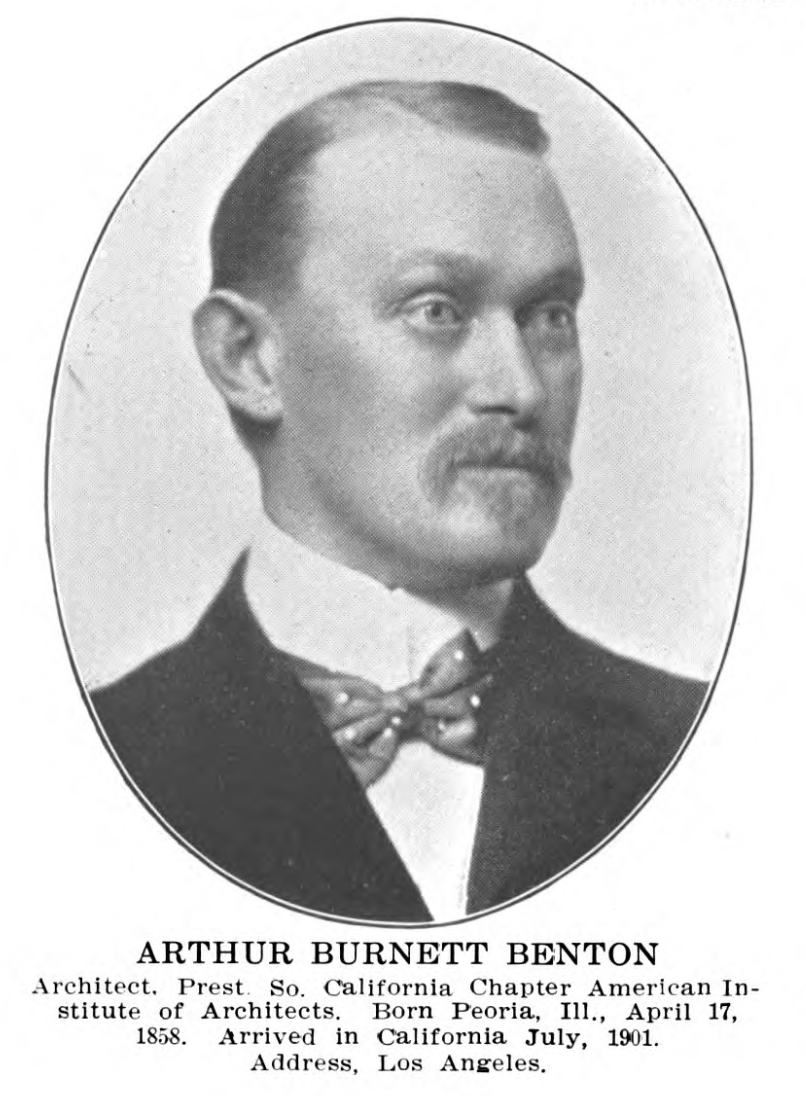
- Born: April 17, 1858; Peoria, Illinois, U.S.
- Died: September 18, 1927 (aged 69)
- Occupation: Architect
- Spouse: Harriet Phillipina von Schilling
- Children: 1

Arthur Burnett Benton (April 17, 1858 – September 18, 1927) was an American architect. Benton promoted Mission Revival architecture.

== Early life ==
Arthur Burnett Benton was born in Peoria, Illinois. He studied at the School of Art and Design, at Topeka, Kansas.

In 1893, he married Harriet Phillipina von Schilling. They had one daughter.

== Career ==
Benton worked for the Atchison, Topeka and Santa Fe Railway. He moved to California in 1901, settling in Los Angeles.

In 1900, he received the commission for the First Church of Christ, Scientist, in Riverside, CA, which was built in that style. This building caught the eye of Frank Augustus Miller, who ran a nearby adobe tourist hotel, known as the Glenwood Inn. Miller had a vision of a great Mission Style hotel and in Benton, he saw the man to make his vision a reality. In 1902, work began on the first phase of the Mission Inn, under Benton’s supervision. He did several additions to the sprawling complex, including the “Cloister Wing”, which was modeled after the Mission in Carmel.

Another commission was the rebuilding of the Arlington Hotel at Santa Barbara in 1911. A previous building had been gutted by fire, so fire safety was an objective in its construction and it incorporated red roof tiles, steel beams, and much brick and concrete. It was destroyed in the 1925 Santa Barbara earthquake; a large water tank in one of the bell towers came crashing down. The tank had been placed there to provide a ready source of water in case of fire, and its collapse caused the only fatalities in the hotel.

Benton also designed large homes for the wealthy in the fashionable West Adams area of Los Angeles.

He was President of the Southern California Chapter of the American Institute of Architects.

His papers are at the University of California, Santa Barbara.

Benton was a very active member of the Society of Colonial War. He was second "Governor" (president) of the California Society from 1908 to 1910. He was admitted to life membership on December 24, 1902. General Society Membership number 3351, California Society number 55.

== Historic buildings ==
- Church of the Epiphany
- First Church of Christ, Scientist
- The Mission Inn
- Mary Andrews Clark Memorial Home
- San Gabriel Mission Playhouse
- San Marcos Hotel, Chandler, Arizona
