= Main Street Pedestrian Mall (Riverside, California) =

US shopping mall

Coordinates: 33°58′56″N 117°22′26″W

The Main Street Pedestrian Mall near the end flanked by the convention center.

The Main Street Pedestrian Mall in Riverside, California, United States, stretching along Main Street from 5th to 10th Street, was opened in 1966. The mall is flanked by the City Hall and convention center at either end. In 2008, the city carried out a $10 million renovation to the mall as part of the larger "Riverside Renaissance" project.

== History ==
=== Before pedestrianization ===
Main Street was the main shopping street of Riverside for decades before it was pedestrianized in 1966. Major department stores included, at various times:

- Sears, opened in February 1929 at 5th and Main, moved in June 1938 to a larger 38,000-foot store in a new art deco building (architect Henry L. A. Jekel) at the southeast corner of 7th (Mission Inn) and Main, on the site of the former Rubidoux Building. It would further expand in the 1950s.
- Westbrook's (1935–1964)
- Grout's
- Montgomery Ward
- J. C. Penney
- Pic 'n Save (1930–1980)
- S. H. Kress dime store, east side of Main between 8th and 9th streets
- Reynold's, at 9th and Main
- Woolworth's, southeast corner of 9th and Main (1940–1957)
