= Orange (fruit) =

Citrus fruit

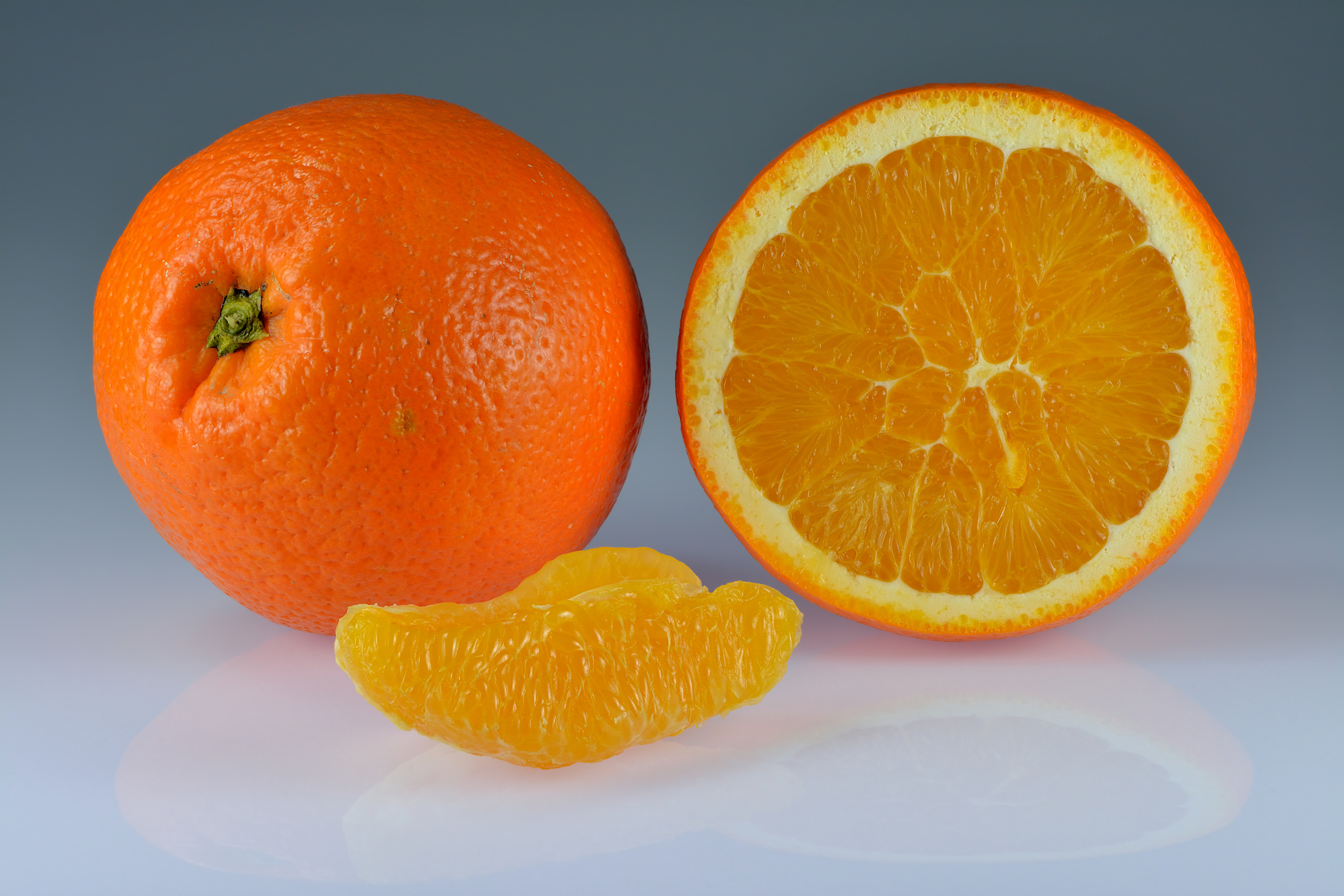
Orange—whole, halved, and peeled segment

The orange, also called sweet orange to distinguish it from the bitter orange (Citrus × aurantium), is the fruit of a tree in the family Rutaceae. Botanically, this is the hybrid Citrus × sinensis, between the pomelo (Citrus maxima) and the mandarin orange (Citrus reticulata). The chloroplast genome, and therefore the maternal line, is that of pomelo. Hybrids of the sweet orange form later types of mandarin and the grapefruit. The sweet orange has had its full genome sequenced.

The orange originated in a region encompassing Southern China, Northeast India, and Myanmar; the earliest mention of the sweet orange was in Chinese literature in 314 BC. Orange trees are widely grown in tropical and subtropical areas for their sweet fruit. The fruit of the orange tree can be eaten fresh or processed for its juice or fragrant peel. In 2024, 67 million tonnes of oranges were grown worldwide, with Brazil producing 23% of the total, followed by China and Mexico.

Oranges, variously understood, have featured in human culture since ancient times. They first appear in Western art in the Arnolfini Portrait by Jan van Eyck, but they had been depicted in Chinese art centuries earlier, as in Zhao Lingrang's Song dynasty fan painting Yellow Oranges and Green Tangerines. By the 17th century, an orangery had become an item of prestige in Europe, as seen at the Versailles Orangerie. More recently, artists such as Vincent van Gogh, John Sloan, and Henri Matisse included oranges in their paintings.

== Description ==
The orange tree is a relatively small evergreen, flowering tree, with an average height of 9 to 10 m (30 to 33 ft), although some very old specimens can reach 15 m (49 ft). Its oval leaves, which are alternately arranged, are 4 to 10 cm (1.6 to 3.9 in) long and have crenulate margins. Sweet oranges grow in a range of different sizes, and shapes varying from spherical to oblong. Inside and attached to the rind is a porous white tissue, the white, bitter mesocarp or albedo (pith). The orange contains a number of distinct carpels (segments or pigs, botanically the fruits) inside, typically about ten, each delimited by a membrane and containing many juice-filled vesicles and usually a few pips. When unripe, the fruit is green. The grainy irregular rind of the ripe fruit can range from bright orange to yellow-orange, but frequently retains green patches or, under warm climate conditions, remains entirely green. Like all other citrus fruits, the sweet orange is non-climacteric, not ripening off the tree. The Citrus sinensis group is subdivided into four classes with distinct characteristics: common oranges, blood or pigmented oranges, navel oranges, and acidless oranges. The fruit is a hesperidium, a modified berry; it is covered by a rind formed by a rugged thickening of the ovary wall.

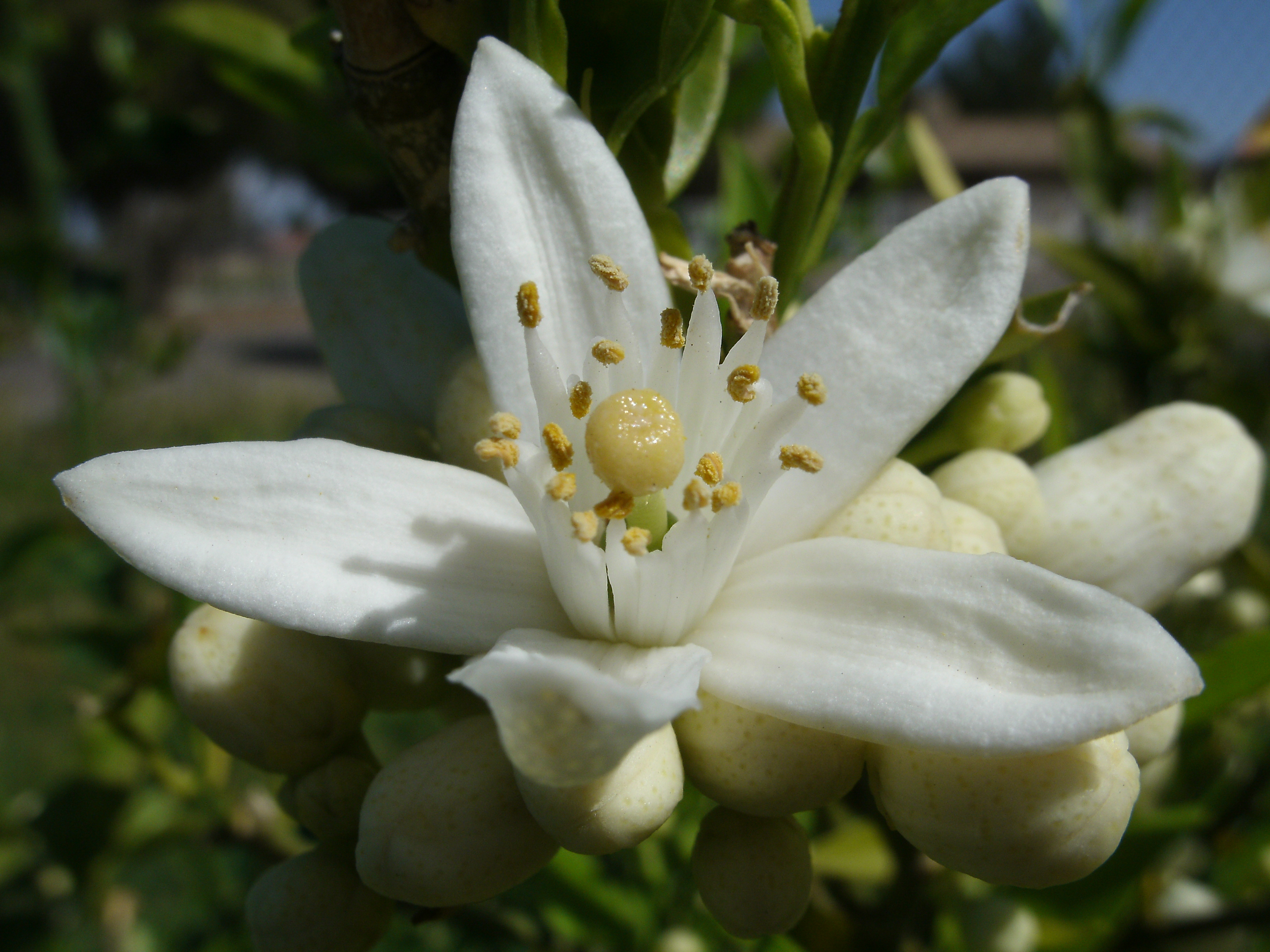
Flowers

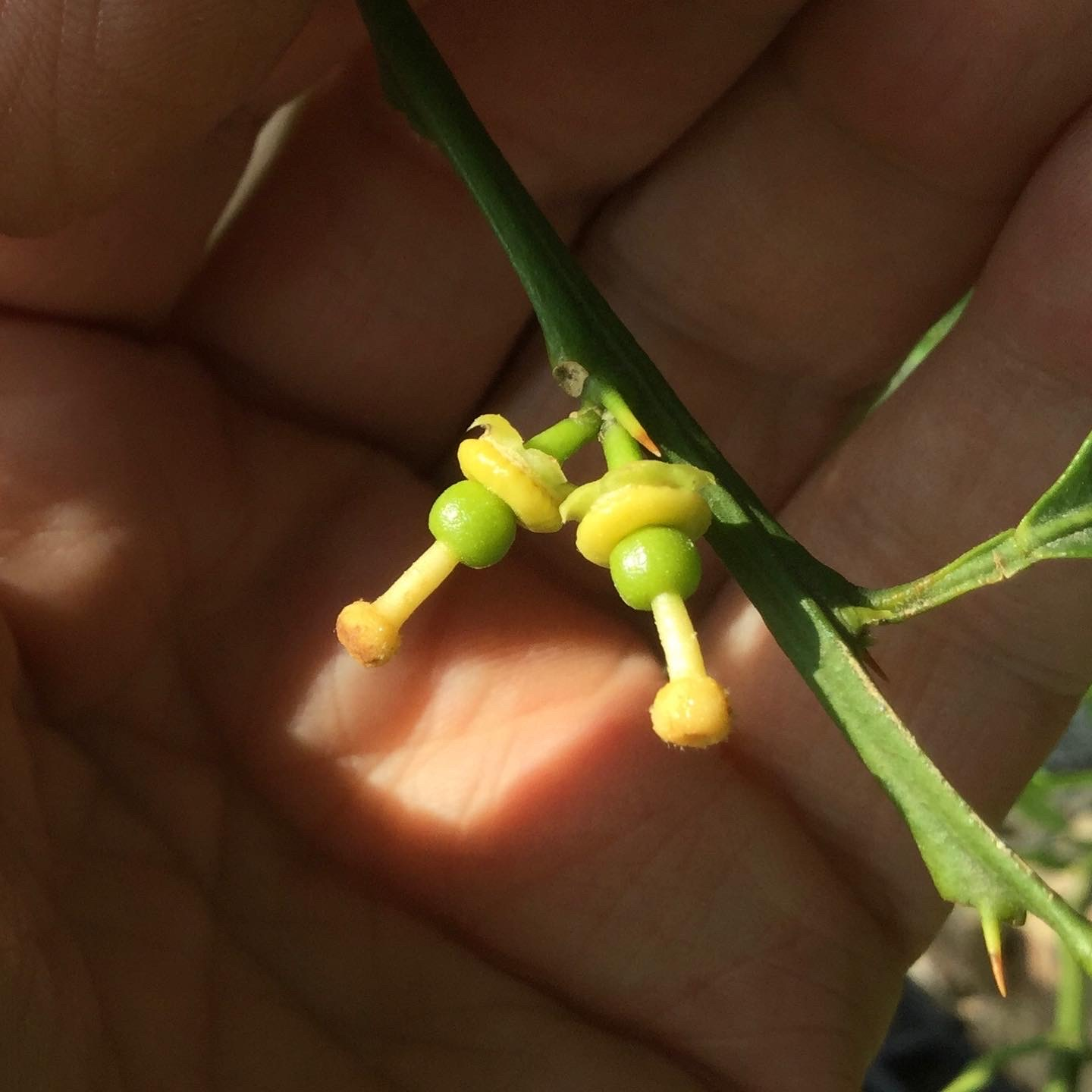
Fruit starting to develop

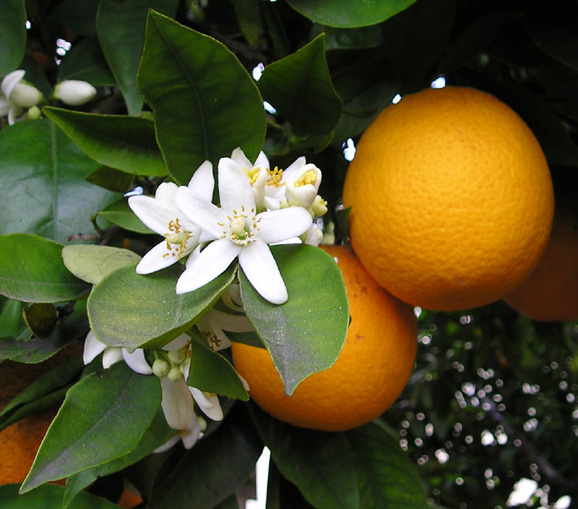
Flowers and fruit simultaneously

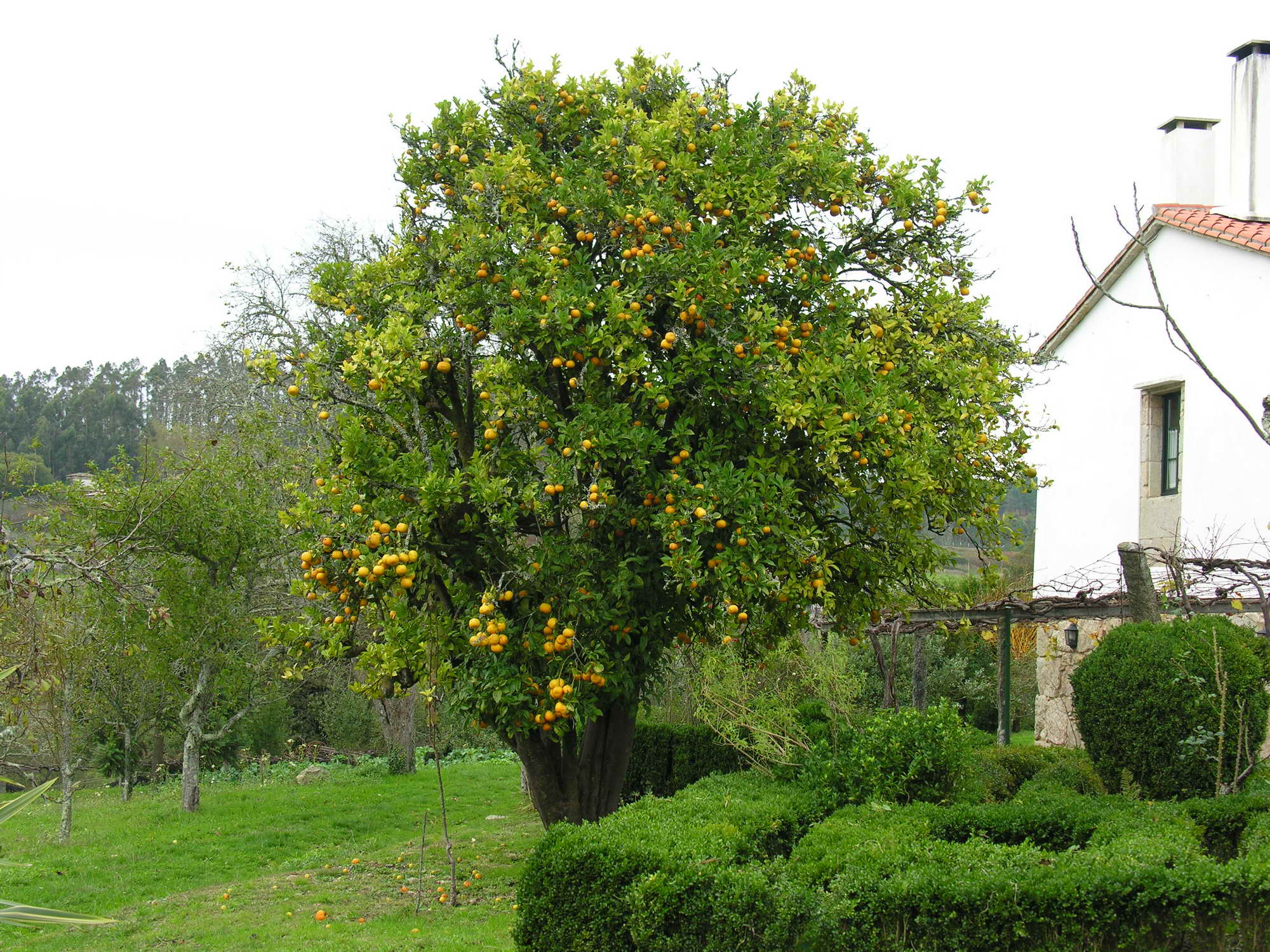
Mature tree in Galicia, Spain, fruiting in November

Structure of the botanical hesperidium

== History ==
=== Hybrid origins ===
Citrus trees are angiosperms, and most species are almost entirely interfertile. This includes grapefruits, lemons, limes, oranges, and many citrus hybrids. As the interfertility of oranges and other citrus has produced numerous hybrids and cultivars, and bud mutations have also been selected, citrus taxonomy has proven difficult.

The sweet orange, Citrus x sinensis, is not a wild fruit, but arose in domestication in East Asia. It originated in a region encompassing Southern China, Northeast India, and Myanmar. The fruit was created as a cross between a non-pure mandarin orange and a hybrid pomelo that had a substantial mandarin component. Since its chloroplast DNA is that of pomelo, it was likely the hybrid pomelo, perhaps a pomelo BC1 backcross, that was the maternal parent of the first orange. Based on genomic analysis, the relative proportions of the ancestral species in the sweet orange are approximately 42% pomelo and 58% mandarin. All varieties of the sweet orange descend from this prototype cross, differing only by mutations selected for during agricultural propagation. Sweet oranges have a distinct origin from the bitter orange, which arose independently, perhaps in the wild, from a cross between pure mandarin and pomelo parents.

Sweet oranges have in turn given rise to many further hybrids including the grapefruit, which arose from a sweet orange x pomelo backcross. Spontaneous and engineered backcrosses between the sweet orange and mandarin oranges or tangerines have produced the clementine and murcott. The ambersweet is a complex sweet orange x (Orlando tangelo x clementine) hybrid. The citranges are a group of sweet orange x trifoliate orange (Citrus trifoliata) hybrids.

The orange is a hybrid of mandarin and pomelo.

=== Arab Agricultural Revolution ===
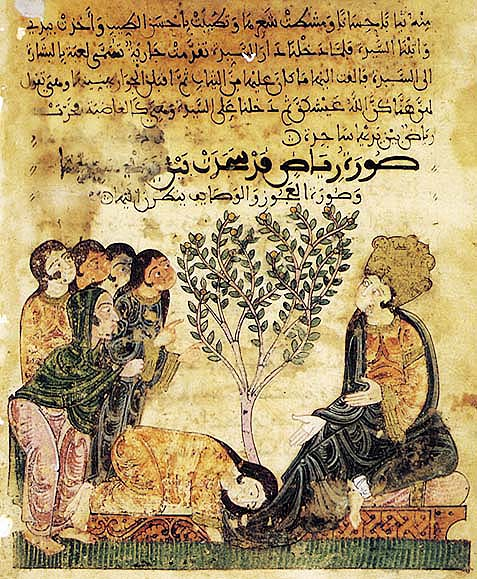
The Arab Agricultural Revolution spread citrus fruits as far as the Iberian Peninsula. Page from the Hadith Bayad wa Riyad, 13th century

In Europe, the Moors introduced citrus fruits including the bitter orange, lemon, and lime to al-Andalus in the Iberian Peninsula during the Arab Agricultural Revolution. Large-scale cultivation started in the 10th century, as evidenced by complex irrigation techniques specifically adapted to support orange orchards. Citrus fruits—among them the bitter orange—were introduced to Sicily in the 9th century during the period of the Emirate of Sicily, but the sweet orange was unknown there until the late 15th century or the beginnings of the 16th century, when Italian and Portuguese merchants brought orange trees into the Mediterranean area.

=== Spread across Europe ===
Shortly afterward, the sweet orange quickly was adopted as an edible fruit. It was considered a luxury food grown by wealthy people in private conservatories, called orangeries. By 1646, the sweet orange was well known throughout Europe; it went on to become the most often cultivated of all fruit trees. Louis XIV of France had a great love of orange trees and built the grandest of all royal Orangeries at the Palace of Versailles. At Versailles, potted orange trees in solid silver tubs were placed throughout the rooms of the palace, while the Orangerie allowed year-round cultivation of the fruit to supply the court. When Louis condemned his finance minister, Nicolas Fouquet, in 1664, part of the treasures that he confiscated were over 1,000 orange trees from Fouquet's estate at Vaux-le-Vicomte.

=== To the Americas ===
Spanish travellers introduced the sweet orange to the American continent. On his second voyage in 1493, Christopher Columbus may have planted the fruit on Hispaniola. Subsequent expeditions in the mid-1500s brought sweet oranges to South America and Mexico, and to Florida in 1565, when Pedro Menéndez de Avilés founded St Augustine. Spanish missionaries brought orange trees to Arizona between 1707 and 1710, while the Franciscans did the same in San Diego, California, in 1769. Archibald Menzies, the botanist on the Vancouver Expedition, collected orange seeds in South Africa, raised the seedlings on board, and gave them to several Hawaiian chiefs in 1792. The sweet orange came to be grown across the Hawaiian Islands, but its cultivation stopped after the arrival of the Mediterranean fruit fly in the early 1900s. Florida farmers obtained seeds from New Orleans around 1872, after which orange groves were established by grafting the sweet orange on to sour orange rootstocks.

==== California ====
Citrus cultivation in California began with the Spanish missionaries, who planted oranges and lemons at Baja California around 1739 and at Alta California missions by 1769. Early fruit was thick-skinned and sour, not suited for commercial markets. The first sizeable grove was established at Mission San Gabriel in 1804, with about 400 trees on six acres. This mission-based agriculture ended with secularisation which closed the missions and gave away their lands in 1835. Jean-Louis Vignes likely planted the first private orange grove in Los Angeles in 1834. William Wolfskill planted his orchard in Los Angeles in 1841. By 1862, his orchards held two-thirds of the state's orange trees. The California gold rush (from 1849) increased demand for oranges, especially for their vitamin C, which helped prevent scurvy among miners. This spurred gradual expansion of orchards. In the early 1870s, Wolfskill's reported profits of $1,000 per acre attracted Midwestern farmers to citrus growing, especially in Orange County.

The 1870s saw the introduction of improved fruit varieties. In 1873, navel orange plants from Brazil were distributed by the U.S. Department of Agriculture. Luther C. Tibbets and Eliza Tibbets successfully cultivated these in Riverside, leading to widespread planting of the sweet, seedless navel orange, which became the backbone of the California citrus industry. The Valencia orange, introduced in 1876, matured in summer and fall, complementing the winter-ripening navel and providing oranges year-round. The completion of major railroads (Southern Pacific in 1877, and the Santa Fe in 1885) and the introduction of ventilated boxcars revolutionised distribution, opening national markets and triggering a planting frenzy in southern California. By 1885, the number of citrus trees in California had grown from 90,000 (in 1875) to 2 million, and to 4.5 million by 1901.

The 1890s brought pest control advances (spraying, fumigation) and frost protection (heaters, later wind machines). The University of California established its Citrus Experiment Station in 1907, supporting research and innovation. Cooperative marketing emerged with the formation of the California Fruit Growers Exchange in 1905, later known as Sunkist Growers Inc., which helped standardise and market California citrus worldwide. By the 1980s, California was the second largest orange producer in the U.S., after Florida.

== Etymology ==
The word "orange" has its etymological roots in the Dravidian language family of South India. From there, the word passed to Sanskrit नारङ्ग (nāraṅga), meaning 'orange tree'. The Sanskrit word reached European languages through Persian نارنگ (nārang) and its Arabic derivative نارنج (nāranj). The word entered Late Middle English in the 14th century via Old French pomme d'orenge. Other forms include Old Provençal auranja, Italian arancia, formerly narancia. In several languages, the initial n present in earlier forms of the word dropped off because it may have been mistaken as part of an indefinite article ending in an n sound. In French, for example, une norenge may have been heard as une orenge. This linguistic change is called juncture loss. The colour was named after the fruit, with the first recorded use of orange as a colour name in English in 1512.

Etymology of 'orange'

== Composition ==
=== Nutrition ===
Oranges, raw, all commercial varieties
Nutritional value per 100 g (3.5 oz)
- Energy: 197 kJ (47 kcal)
- Carbohydrates: 11.75 g
- Sugars: 9.35 g
- Dietary fibre: 2.4 g
- Fat: 0.12 g
- Protein: 0.94 g
Vitamins and minerals
Vitamins	Quantity %DV^{†}
Vitamin A equiv.	1% 11 μg
Thiamine (B1)	7% 0.087 mg
Riboflavin (B2)	3% 0.04 mg
Niacin (B3)	2% 0.282 mg
Pantothenic acid (B5)	5% 0.25 mg
Vitamin B6	4% 0.06 mg
Folate (B9)	8% 30 μg
Choline	2% 8.4 mg
Vitamin C	59% 53.2 mg
Vitamin E	1% 0.18 mg
Minerals	Quantity %DV^{†}
Calcium	3% 40 mg
Iron	1% 0.1 mg
Magnesium	2% 10 mg
Manganese	1% 0.025 mg
Phosphorus	1% 14 mg
Potassium	6% 181 mg
Zinc	1% 0.07 mg
- Other constituents: Quantity
- Water: 87 g
- Link to USDA Database entry
- ^{†}Percentages estimated using US recommendations for adults, except for potassium, which is estimated based on expert recommendation from the National Academies.

Orange flesh is 87% water, 12% carbohydrates, 1% protein, and contains negligible fat (table). In a reference amount of 100 g (3.5 oz), orange flesh provides 47 calories, and is a rich source of vitamin C, providing 59% of the Daily Value, with no other micronutrients in significant amounts (table).

=== Phytochemicals ===
Oranges contain diverse phytochemicals, including carotenoids (beta-carotene, lutein and beta-cryptoxanthin), flavonoids (e.g. naringenin) and numerous volatile organic compounds producing orange aroma, including aldehydes, esters, terpenes, alcohols, and ketones. Orange juice contains only about one-fifth the citric acid of lime or lemon juice (which contain about 47 g/L).

=== Taste ===
Octyl acetate, a volatile compound contributing to the fragrance of oranges

The taste of oranges is determined mainly by the ratio of sugars to acids, whereas orange aroma derives from volatile organic compounds, including alcohols, aldehydes, ketones, terpenes, and esters. Bitter limonoid compounds, such as limonin, decrease gradually during development, whereas volatile aroma compounds tend to peak in mid- to late-season development. Taste quality tends to improve later in harvests when there is a higher sugar/acid ratio with less bitterness. As a citrus fruit, the orange is acidic, with pH levels ranging from 2.9 to 4.0. Taste and aroma vary according to genetic background, environmental conditions during development, ripeness at harvest, postharvest conditions, and storage duration.

== Cultivars ==
=== Common ===
Common oranges (also called "white", "round", or "blond" oranges) constitute about two-thirds of all orange production. The majority of this crop is used for juice.

=== Valencia ===
The Valencia orange is a late-season fruit; it is popular when navel oranges are out of season. Thomas Rivers, an English nurseryman, imported this variety from the Azores and catalogued it in 1865 under the name Excelsior. Around 1870, he provided trees to S. B. Parsons, a Long Island nurseryman, who in turn sold them to E. H. Hart of Federal Point, Florida.

=== Navel ===
Navel oranges have a characteristic second fruit at the apex, which protrudes slightly like a human navel. They are mainly an eating fruit, as their thicker skin makes them easy to peel, they are less juicy and their bitterness makes them less suitable for juice. The parent variety was probably the Portuguese navel orange or Umbigo. The cultivar rapidly spread to other countries, but being seedless it had to be propagated by cutting and grafting.

The Cara Cara is a type of navel orange grown mainly in Venezuela, South Africa and California's San Joaquin Valley. It is sweet and low in acid, with distinctively pinkish red flesh. It was discovered at the Hacienda Cara Cara in Valencia, Venezuela, in 1976.

=== Blood ===
Blood oranges, with an intense red colouration inside, are widely grown around the Mediterranean; there are several cultivars. The development of the red colour requires cool nights. The redness is mainly due to the anthocyanin pigment chrysanthemin (cyanidin 3-O-glucoside).

=== Acidless ===
Acidless oranges are an early-season fruit with very low levels of acid. They also are called "sweet" oranges in the United States, with similar names in other countries: douce in France, sucrena in Spain, dolce or maltese in Italy, meski in North Africa and the Near East (where they are especially popular), succari in Egypt, and lima in Brazil. The lack of acid, which protects orange juice against spoilage in other groups, renders them generally unfit for processing as juice, so they are primarily eaten. They remain profitable in areas of local consumption, but rapid spoilage renders them unsuitable for export to major population centres of Europe, Asia, or the United States.

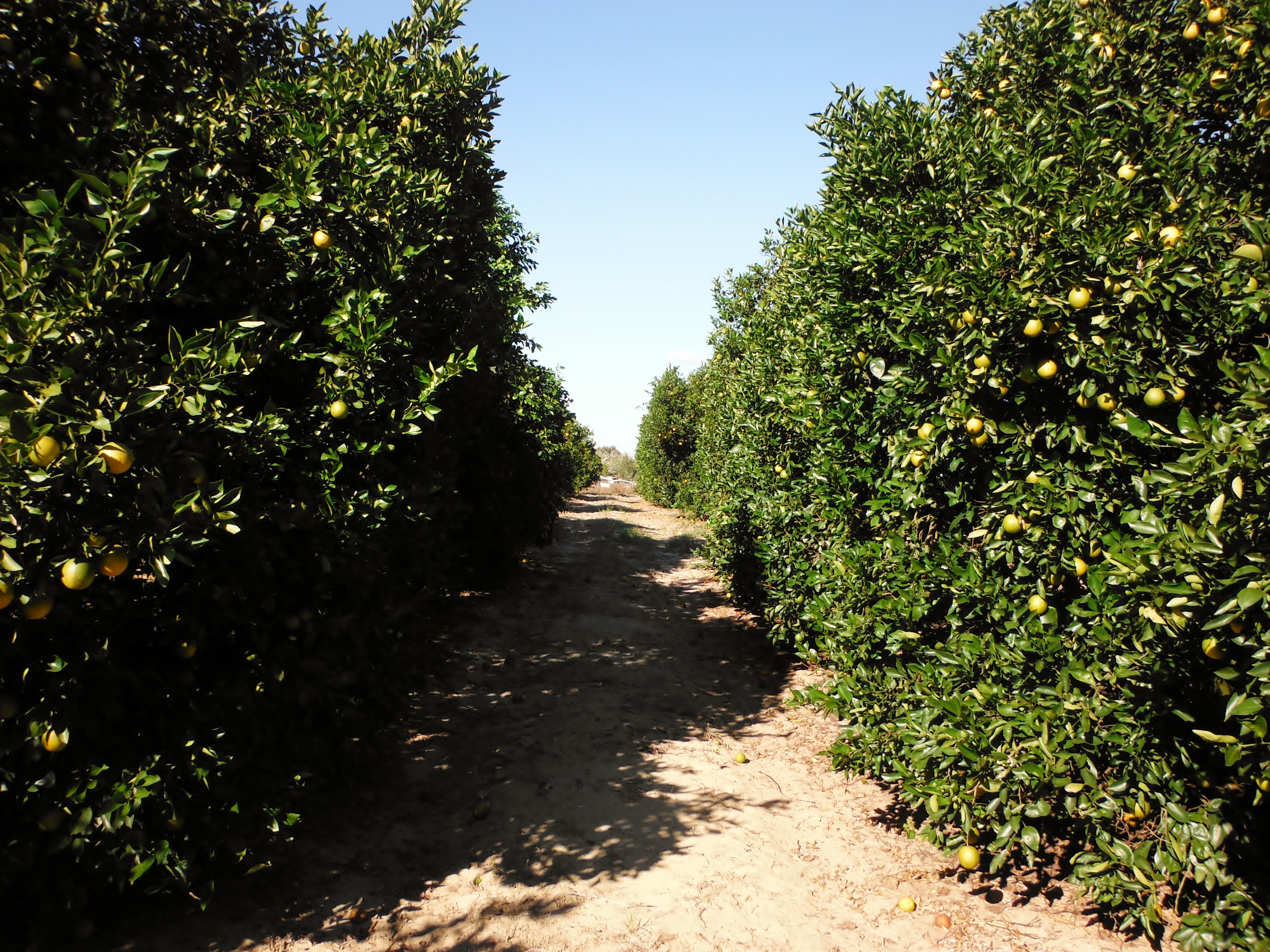
A grove of Valencia oranges in Florida

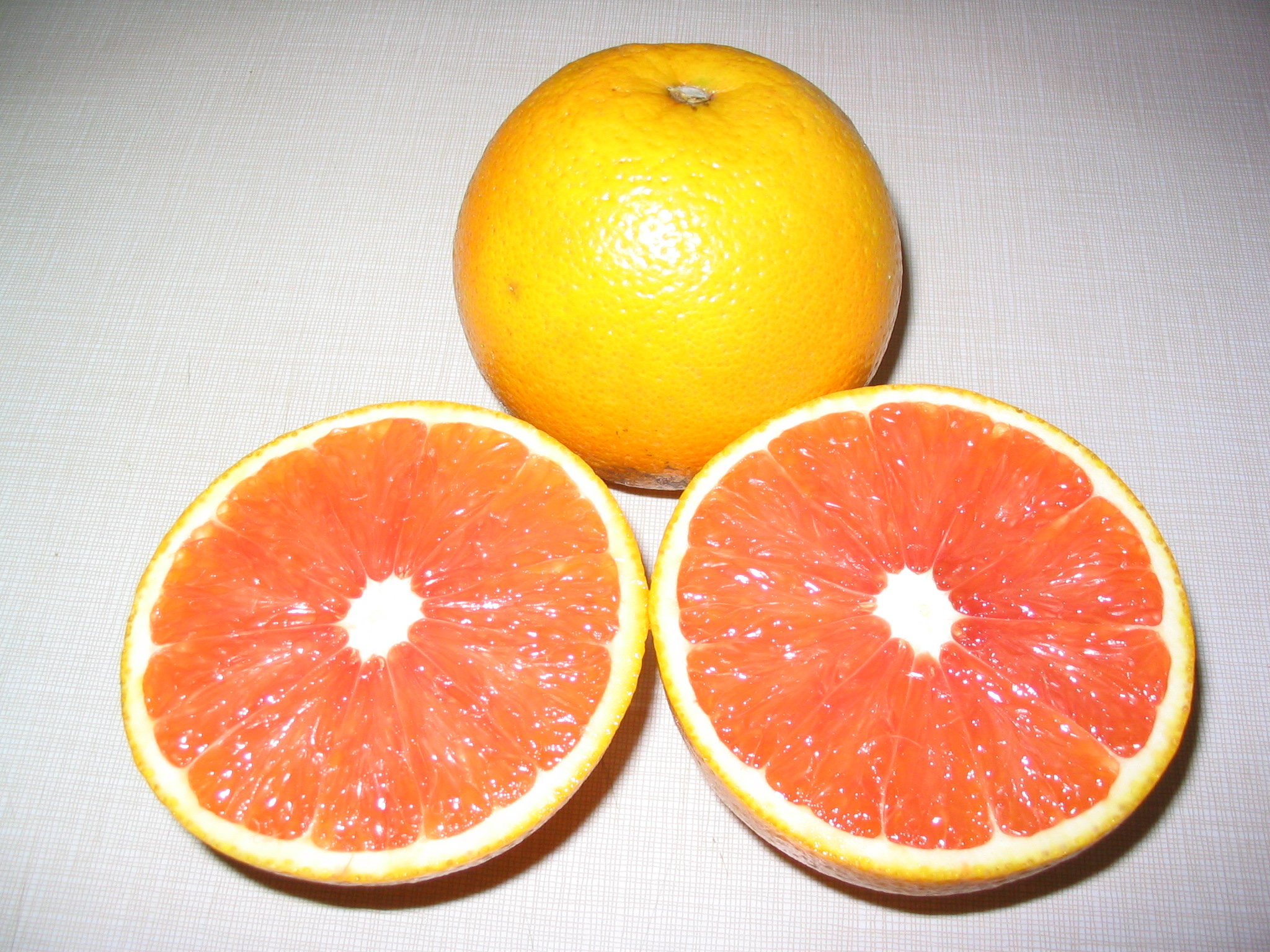
Cara Cara navel orange

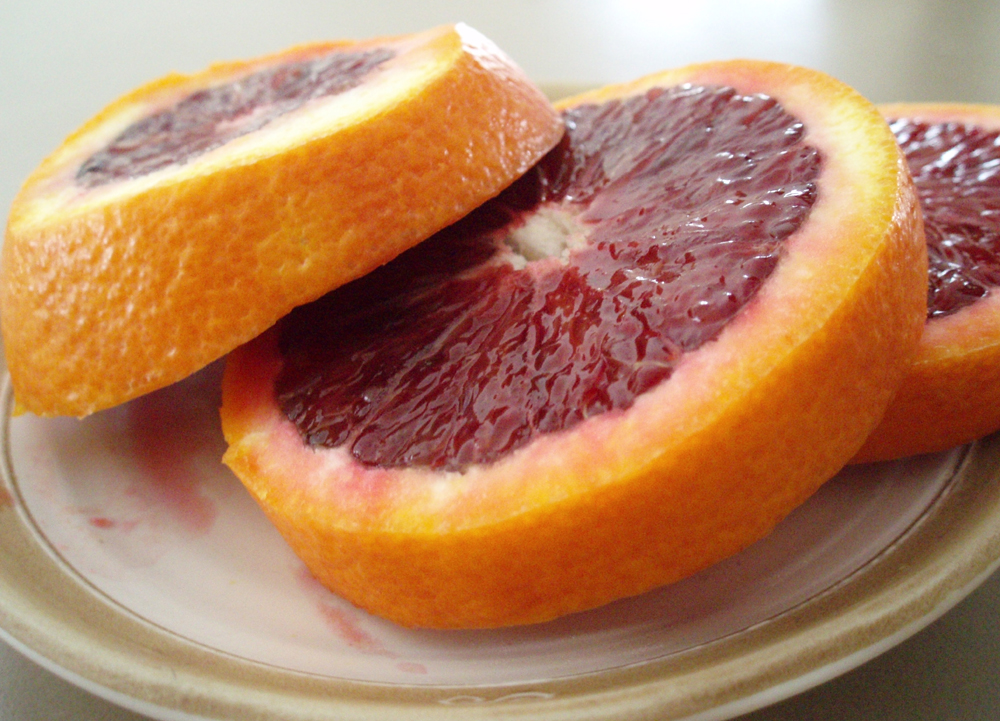
Blood orange

== Cultivation ==
=== Climate ===
Like most citrus plants, oranges do well under moderate temperatures—between 15.5 and 29 °C (59.9 and 84.2 °F)—and require considerable amounts of sunshine and water. They are principally grown in tropical and subtropical regions.

As oranges are sensitive to frost, farmers have developed methods to protect the trees from frost damage. A common process is to spray the trees with water so as to cover them with a thin layer of ice, insulating them even if air temperatures drop far lower. This practice, however, offers protection only for a very short time. Another procedure involves burning fuel oil in smudge pots put between the trees. These burn with a great deal of particulate emission, so condensation of water vapour on the particulate soot prevents condensation on plants and raises the air temperature very slightly. Smudge pots were developed after a disastrous freeze in southern California in January 1913 destroyed a whole crop.

=== Propagation ===
Commercially grown orange trees are propagated asexually by grafting a mature cultivar onto a suitable seedling rootstock to ensure the same yield, identical fruit characteristics, and resistance to diseases throughout the years. Propagation involves two stages: first, a rootstock is grown from seed. Then, when it is approximately one year old, the leafy top is cut off and a bud taken from a specific scion variety, is grafted into its bark. The scion is what determines the variety of orange, while the rootstock makes the tree resistant to pests and diseases and adaptable to specific soil and climatic conditions. Thus, rootstocks influence the rate of growth and have an effect on fruit yield and quality. Rootstocks must be compatible with the variety inserted into them because otherwise, the tree may decline, be less productive, or die. Among the advantages to grafting are that trees mature uniformly and begin to bear fruit earlier than those reproduced by seeds (3 to 4 years in contrast with 6 to 7 years), and that farmers can combine the best attributes of a scion with those of a rootstock.

=== Harvest ===
Canopy-shaking mechanical harvesters are being used increasingly in Florida to harvest oranges. Current canopy shaker machines use a series of six-to-seven-foot-long tines to shake the tree canopy at a relatively constant stroke and frequency. Oranges are picked once they are pale orange.

=== Degreening ===
Oranges must be mature when harvested. In the United States, laws forbid harvesting immature fruit for human consumption in Texas, Arizona, California, and Florida. Ripe oranges, however, often have some green or yellow-green colour in the skin. Ethylene gas is used to turn green skin to orange. This process is known as "degreening", "gassing", "sweating", or "curing". Oranges are non-climacteric fruits, and cannot ripen internally in response to ethylene gas after harvesting, though they will de-green externally.

=== Storage ===
Commercially, oranges can be stored by refrigeration in controlled-atmosphere chambers for up to twelve weeks after harvest. Storage life ultimately depends on cultivar, maturity, pre-harvest conditions, and handling. At home, oranges have a shelf life of about one month, and are best stored loose.

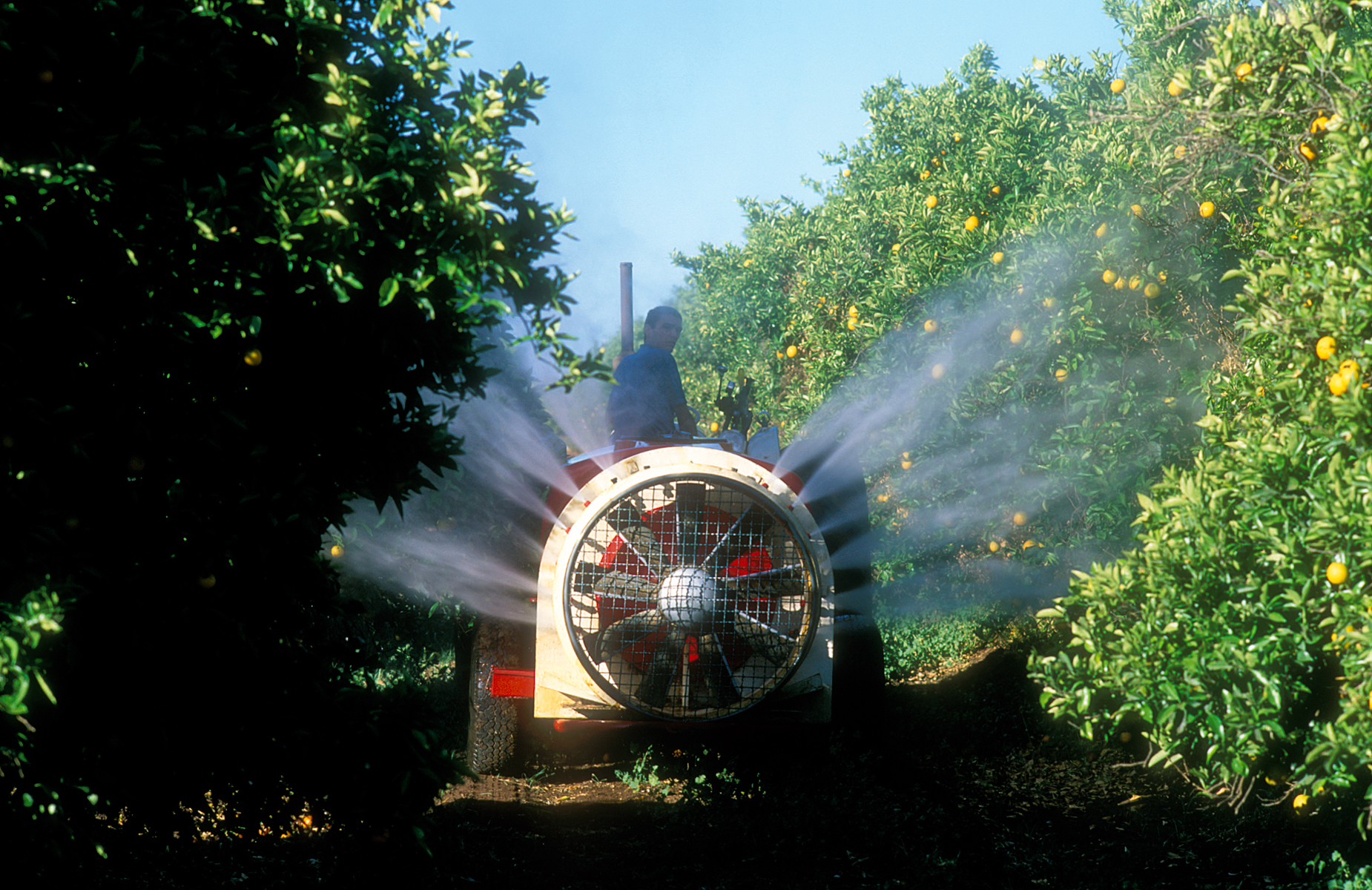
Spraying oranges in an orchard in Australia

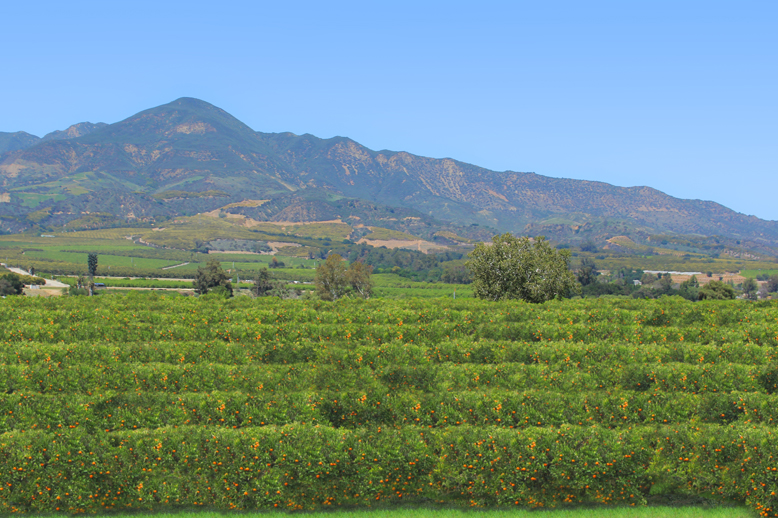
Orange grove in California

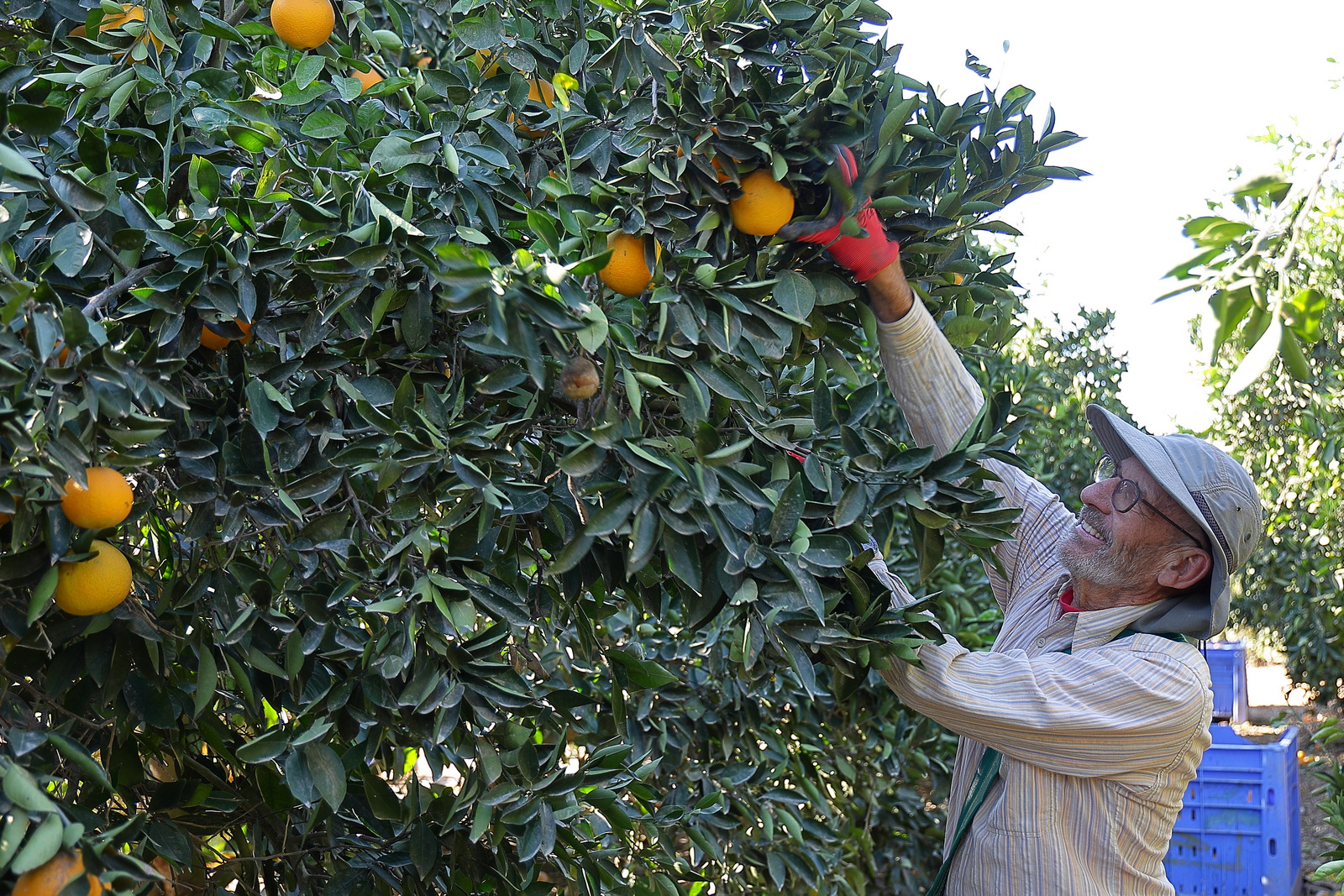
Picking oranges, Israel

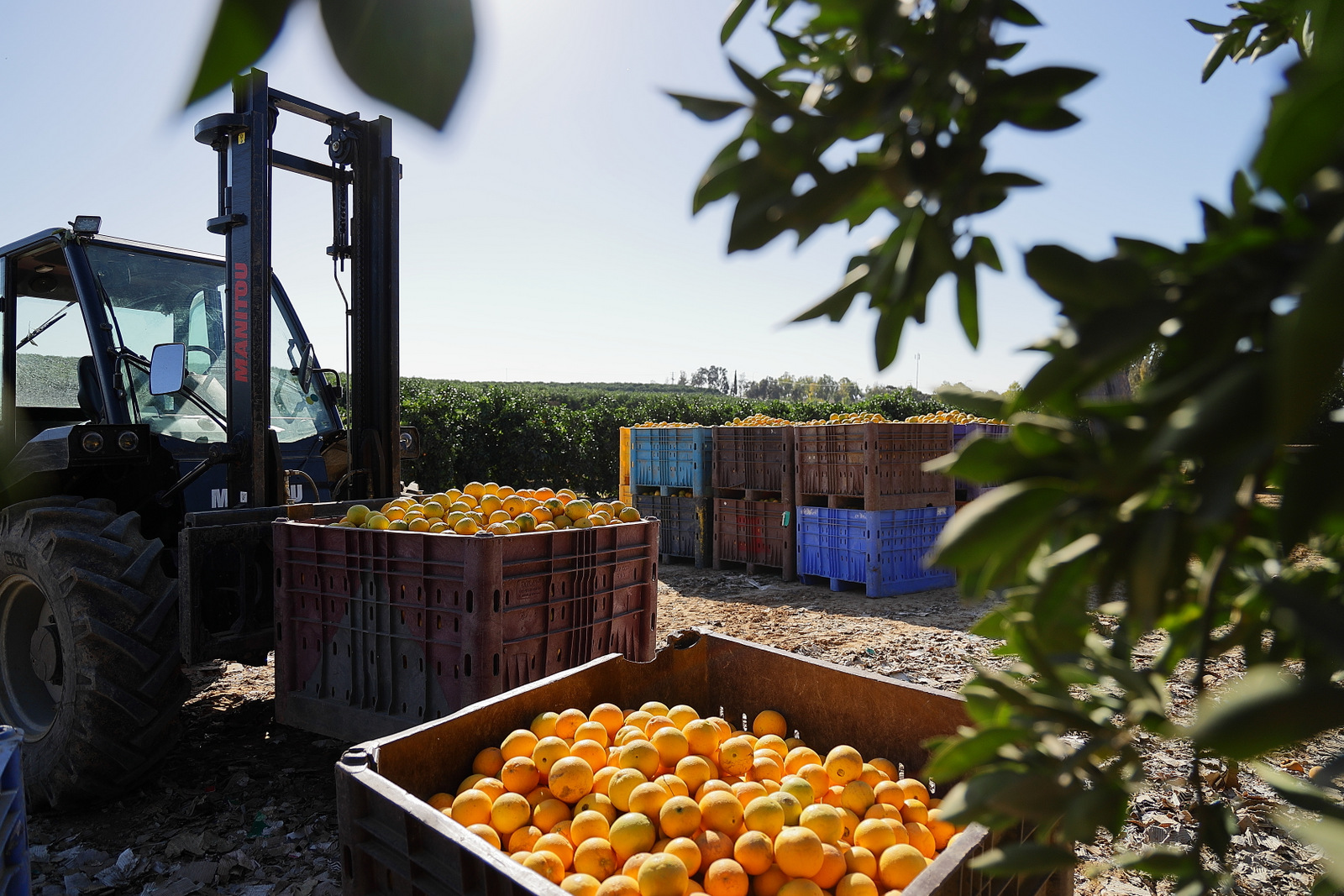
Harvest, Israel

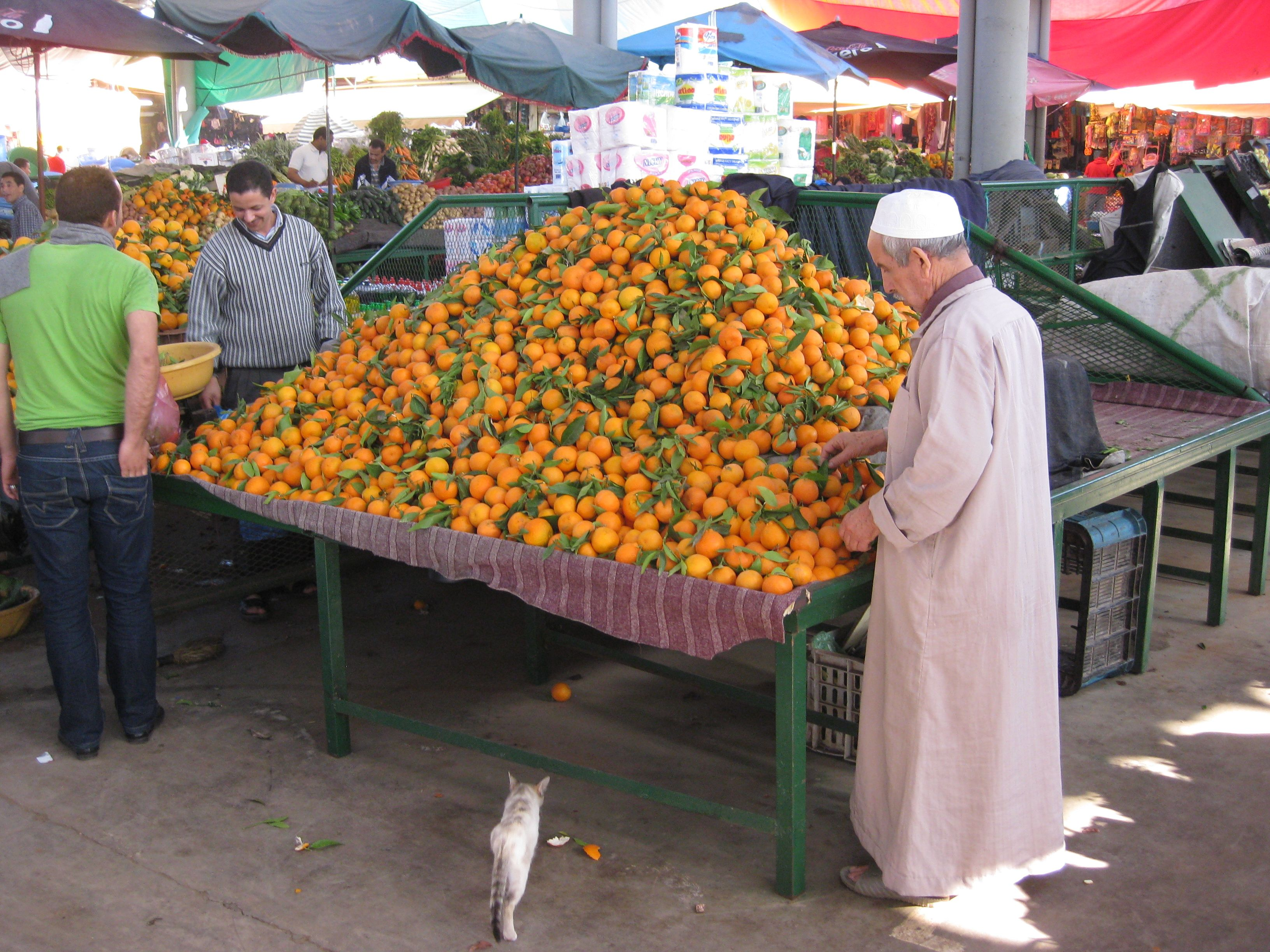
Market stall, Morocco

== Pests and diseases ==
=== Pests ===
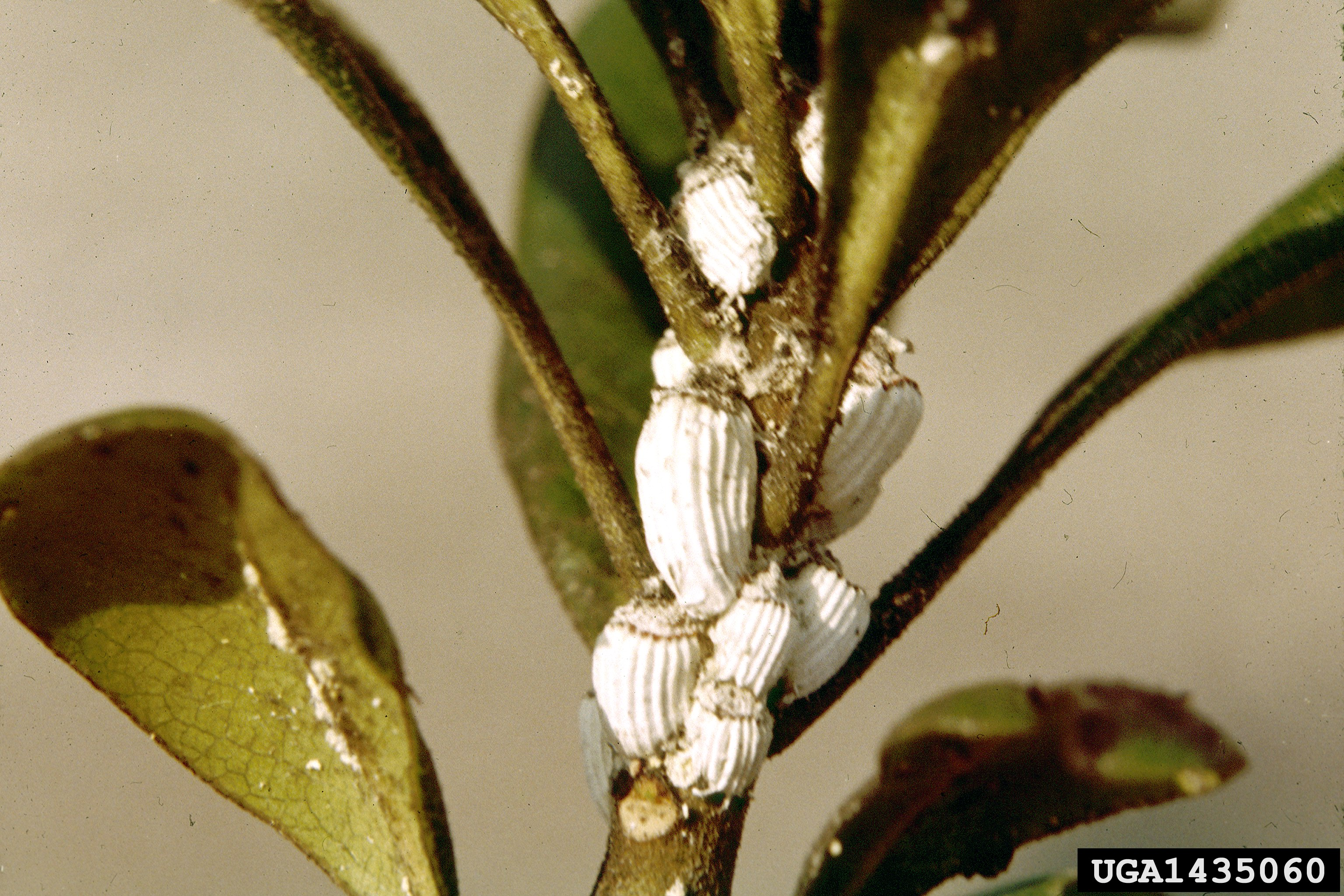
Cottony cushion scale insects devastated orange groves across California in the 19th century, and were the first pest to be subject to successful biological control.

The first major pest that attacked orange trees in the United States was the cottony cushion scale (Icerya purchasi), imported from Australia to California in 1868. Within 20 years, it wiped out the citrus orchards around Los Angeles, and limited orange growth throughout California. In 1888, the USDA sent Alfred Koebele to Australia to study this scale insect in its native habitat. He brought back with him specimens of an Australian ladybird, Novius cardinalis (the Vedalia beetle), and within a decade the pest was controlled. This was one of the first successful applications of biological pest control on any crop. The orange dog caterpillar of the giant swallowtail butterfly, Papilio cresphontes, is a pest of citrus plantations in North America, where it eats new foliage and can defoliate young trees.

=== Diseases ===
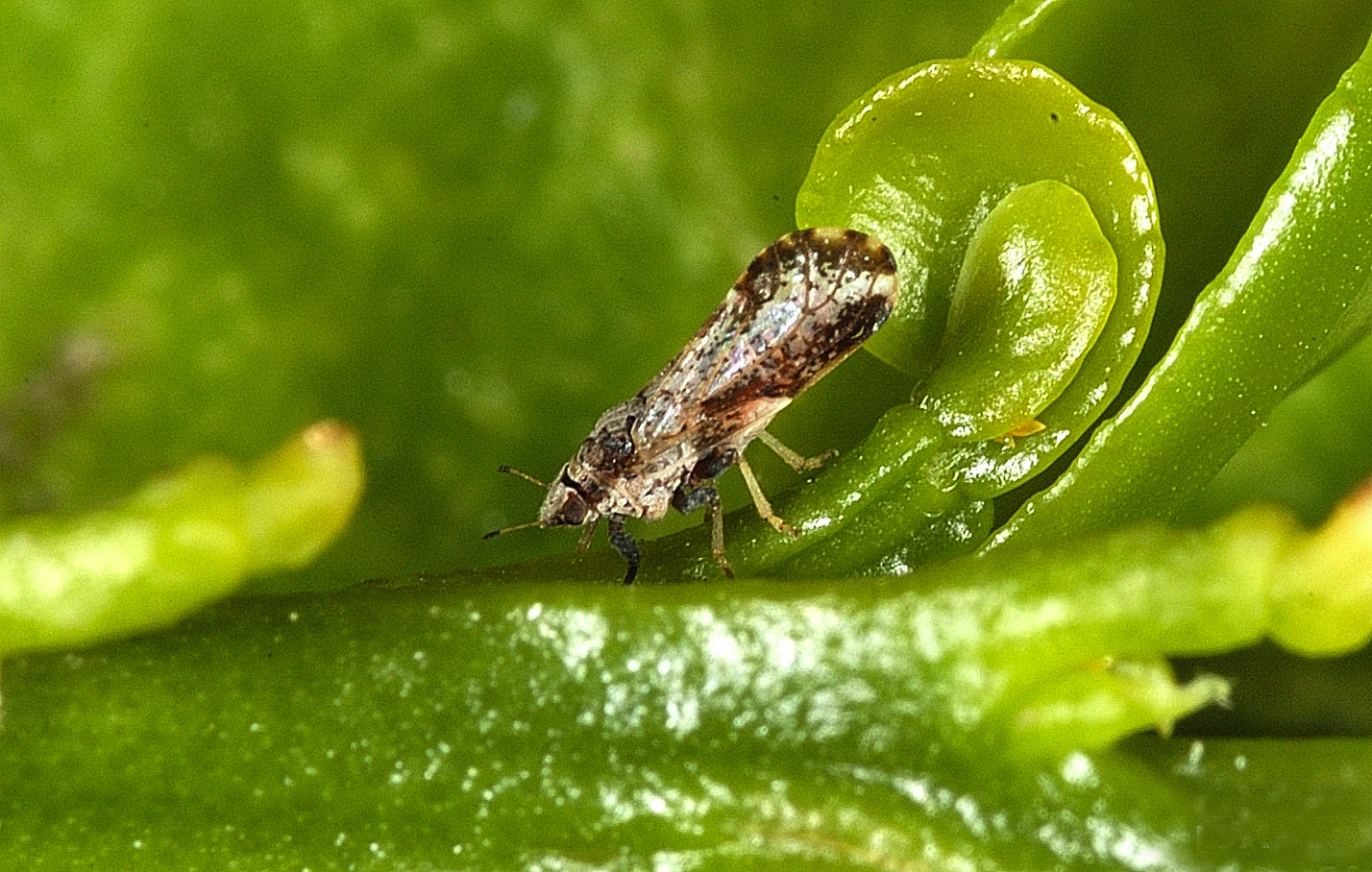
The Asian citrus psyllid, Diaphorina citri, is a major vector of citrus greening disease.

Citrus greening disease, caused by the bacterium Liberobacter asiaticum, has been the most serious threat to orange production since 2010. It is characterised by streaks of different shades on the leaves, and deformed, poorly coloured, unsavoury fruit. In areas where the disease is endemic, citrus trees live for only five to eight years and never bear fruit suitable for consumption. In the western hemisphere, the disease was discovered in Florida in 1998, where it has attacked nearly all the trees ever since. It was reported in Brazil by Fundecitrus Brasil in 2004. As from 2009, 0.87% of the trees in Brazil's main orange growing areas (São Paulo and Minas Gerais) showed symptoms of greening, an increase of 49% over 2008. The disease is spread primarily by psyllid plant lice such as the Asian citrus psyllid (Diaphorina citri Kuwayama), an efficient vector of the bacterium. Foliar insecticides reduce psyllid populations for a short time, but also suppress beneficial predatory ladybird beetles. Soil application of aldicarb provided limited control of Asian citrus psyllid, while drenches of imidacloprid to young trees were effective for two months or more. Management of citrus greening disease requires an integrated approach that includes use of clean stock, elimination of inoculum via voluntary and regulatory means, use of pesticides to control psyllid vectors in the citrus crop, and biological control of the vectors in non-crop reservoirs.

Greasy spot, a fungal disease caused by the ascomycete Mycosphaerella citri, produces leaf spots and premature defoliation, thus reducing the tree's vigour and yield. Ascospores of M. citri are generated in pseudothecia in decomposing fallen leaves.

Oranges 2024, millions of tonnes
Brazil	15.7
China	7.6
Mexico	4.8
Egypt	4.2
India	3.9
Spain	2.9
World	67.2
Source: FAOSTAT of the United Nations

== Production ==
In 2024, world production of oranges was 67 million tonnes, led by Brazil with 23% of the total, followed by China, Mexico, and Egypt (table).

Orange production

Orange yields

== Culinary use ==
Yearly per capita supply of oranges

=== Dessert fruit and juice ===
Oranges, whose flavour may vary from sweet to sour, are commonly peeled and eaten fresh raw as a dessert. Orange juice is obtained by squeezing the fruit on a special tool (a juicer or squeezer) and collecting the juice in a tray or tank underneath. This can be made at home or, on a much larger scale, industrially. Orange juice is a traded commodity on the Intercontinental Exchange. Frozen orange juice concentrate is made from freshly squeezed and filtered juice.

=== Marmalade ===
Oranges are made into jam in many countries; in Britain, bitter Seville oranges are used to make marmalade. Almost the whole Spanish production is exported to Britain for this purpose. The entire fruit is cut up and boiled with sugar; the pith contributes pectin, which helps the marmalade to set. The first recipe was by an Englishwoman, Mary Kettilby, in 1714. Pieces of peel were first added by Janet Keiller of Dundee in the 1790s, contributing a distinctively bitter taste. Orange peel contains the bitter substances limonene and naringin.

=== Extracts ===
Zest is scraped from the coloured outer part of the peel, and used as a flavouring and garnish in desserts and cocktails.

Sweet orange oil is a by-product of the juice industry produced by pressing the peel. It is used for flavouring food and drinks; it is employed in the perfume industry and in aromatherapy for its fragrance. The oil consists of approximately 90% D-limonene, a solvent used in household chemicals such as wood conditioners for furniture and—along with other citrus oils—detergents and hand cleansers. It is an efficient cleaning agent with a pleasant smell, promoted for being environmentally friendly and therefore preferable to petrochemicals. It is, however, irritating to the skin and toxic to aquatic life.

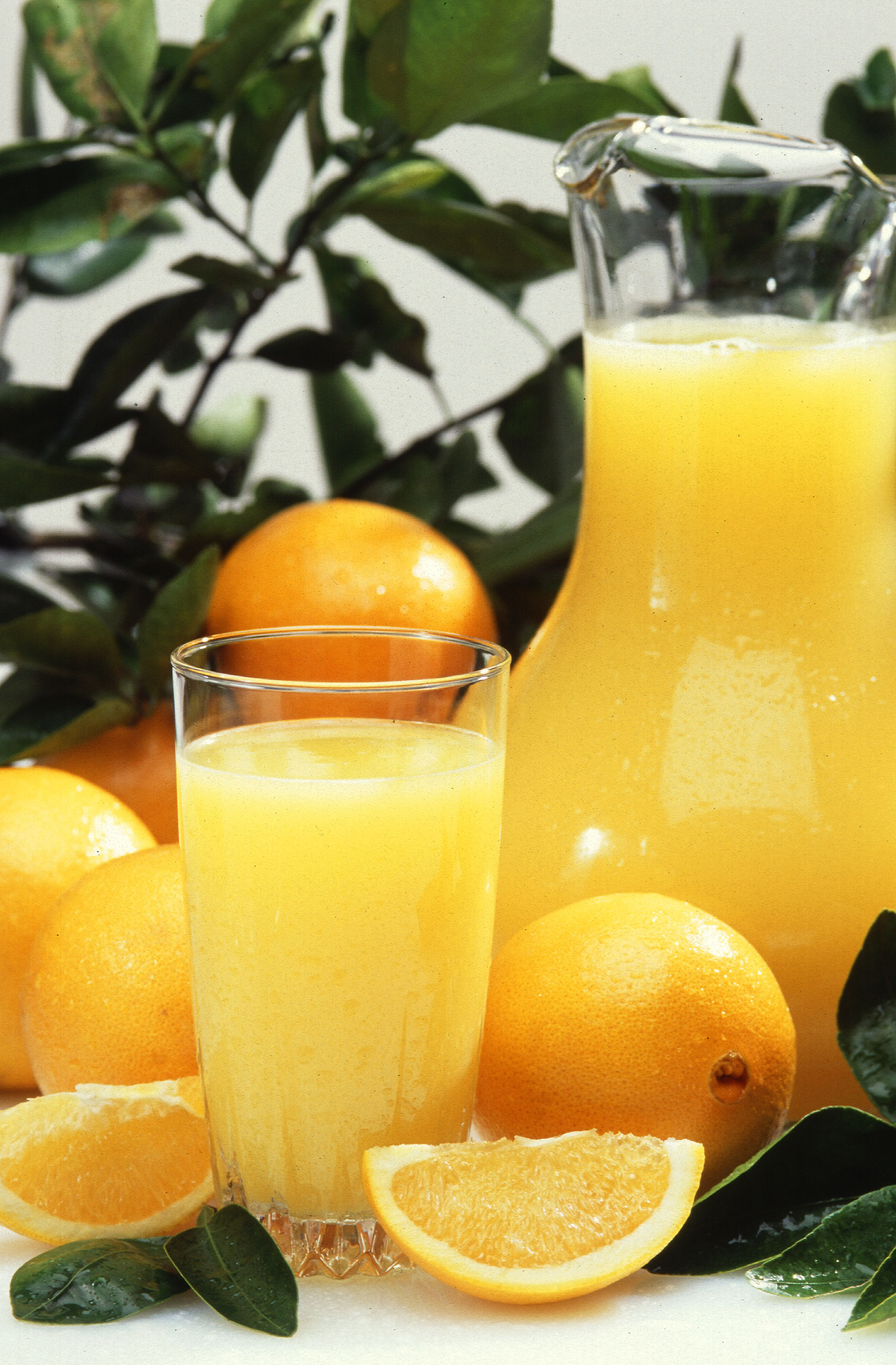
Fruit and juice

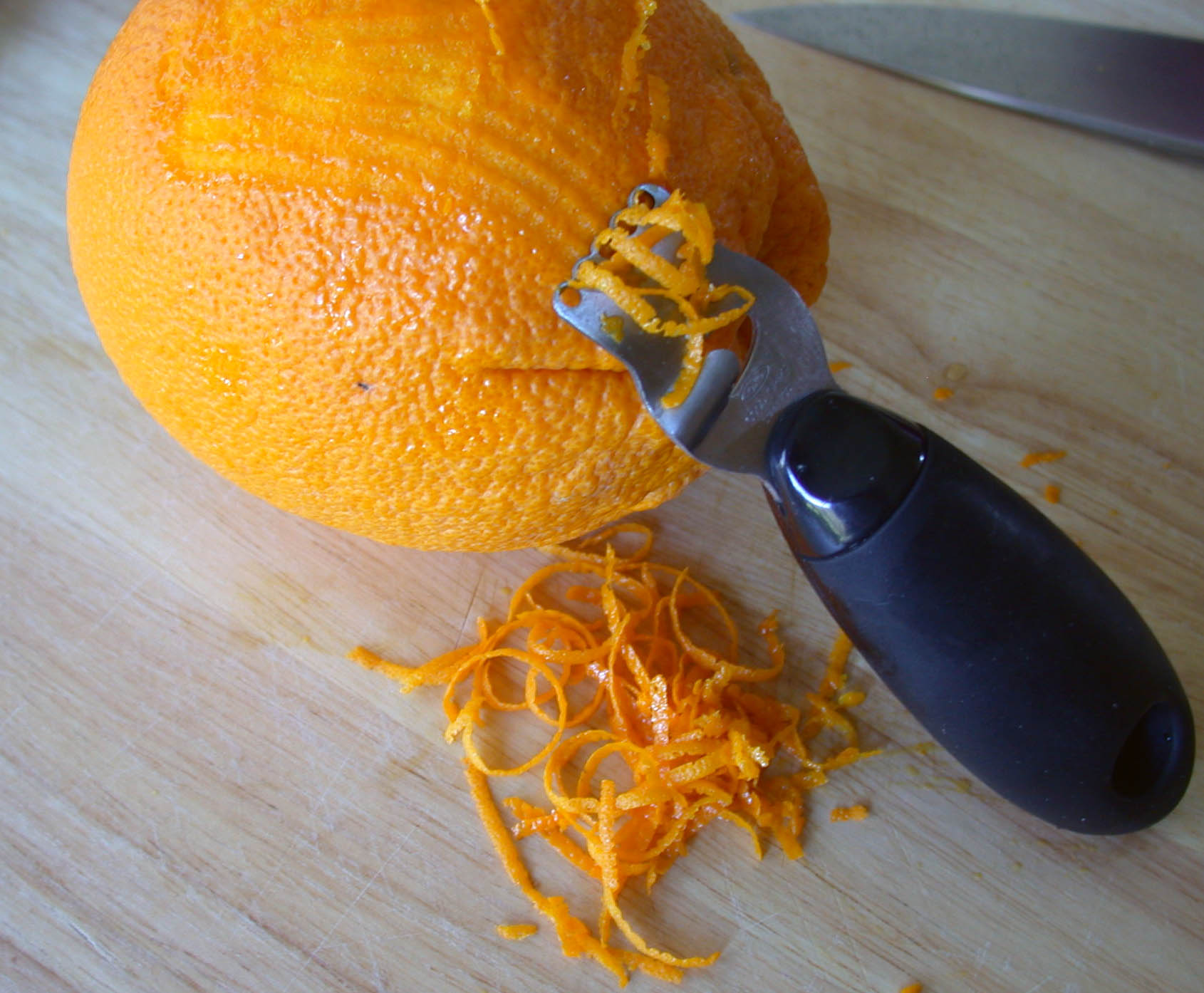
Zesting an orange

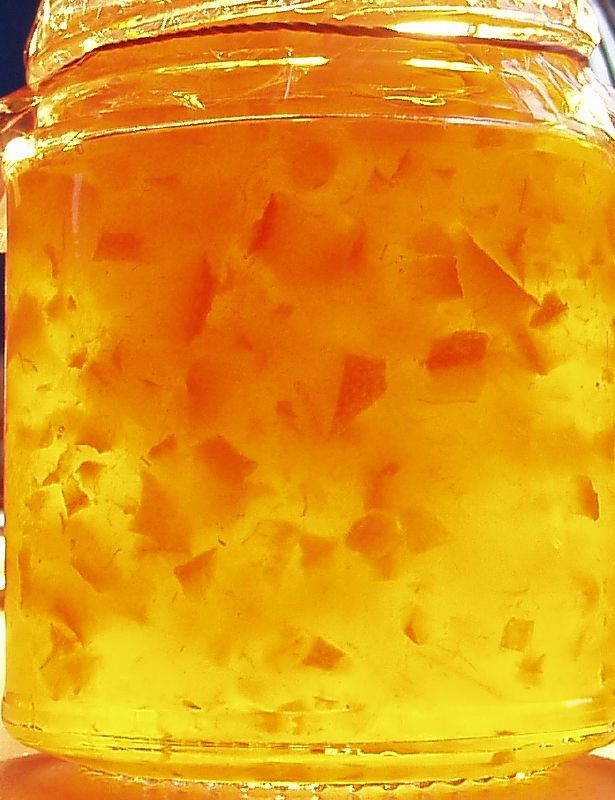
Homemade marmalade, England

== In culture ==
Oranges have featured in human culture since ancient times. The earliest mention of the sweet orange in Chinese literature dates from 314 BC. Larissa Pham, in The Paris Review, notes that sweet oranges were available in China much earlier than in the West. She writes that Zhao Lingrang's fan painting Yellow Oranges and Green Tangerines pays attention not to the fruit's colour but the shape of the fruit-laden trees, and that Su Shi's poem on the same subject runs "You must remember, / the best scenery of the year, / Is exactly now, / when oranges turn yellow and tangerines green."

The scholar Cristina Mazzoni has examined the multiple uses of the fruit in Italian art and literature, from Catherine of Siena's sending of candied oranges to Pope Urban, to Sandro Botticelli's setting of his painting Primavera in an orange grove. She notes that oranges symbolised desire and wealth on the one hand, and deformity on the other, while in the fairy-stories of Sicily, they have magical properties. Pham comments that the Arnolfini Portrait by Jan van Eyck contains in a small detail one of the first representations of oranges in Western art, the costly fruit perhaps traded by the merchant Arnolfini himself. By the 17th century, orangeries were added to great houses in Europe, both to enable the fruit to be grown locally and for prestige, as seen in the Versailles Orangerie completed in 1686.

The Dutch Post-Impressionist artist Vincent van Gogh portrayed oranges in paintings such as his 1889 Still Life of Oranges and Lemons with Blue Gloves and his 1890 A Child with Orange, both works late in his life. The American artist of the Ashcan School, John Sloan, made a 1935 painting Blond Nude with Orange, Blue Couch, while Henri Matisse's last painting was his 1951 Nude with Oranges; after that he only made cut-outs.

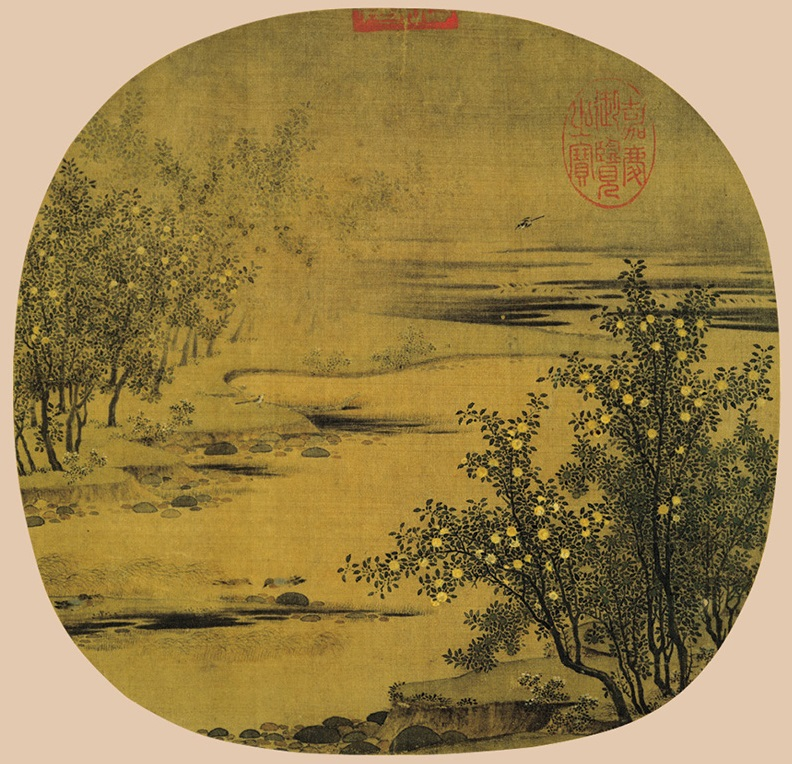
Yellow Oranges and Green Tangerines by Zhao Lingrang, Chinese fan painting from the Song dynasty, c. 1070–1100

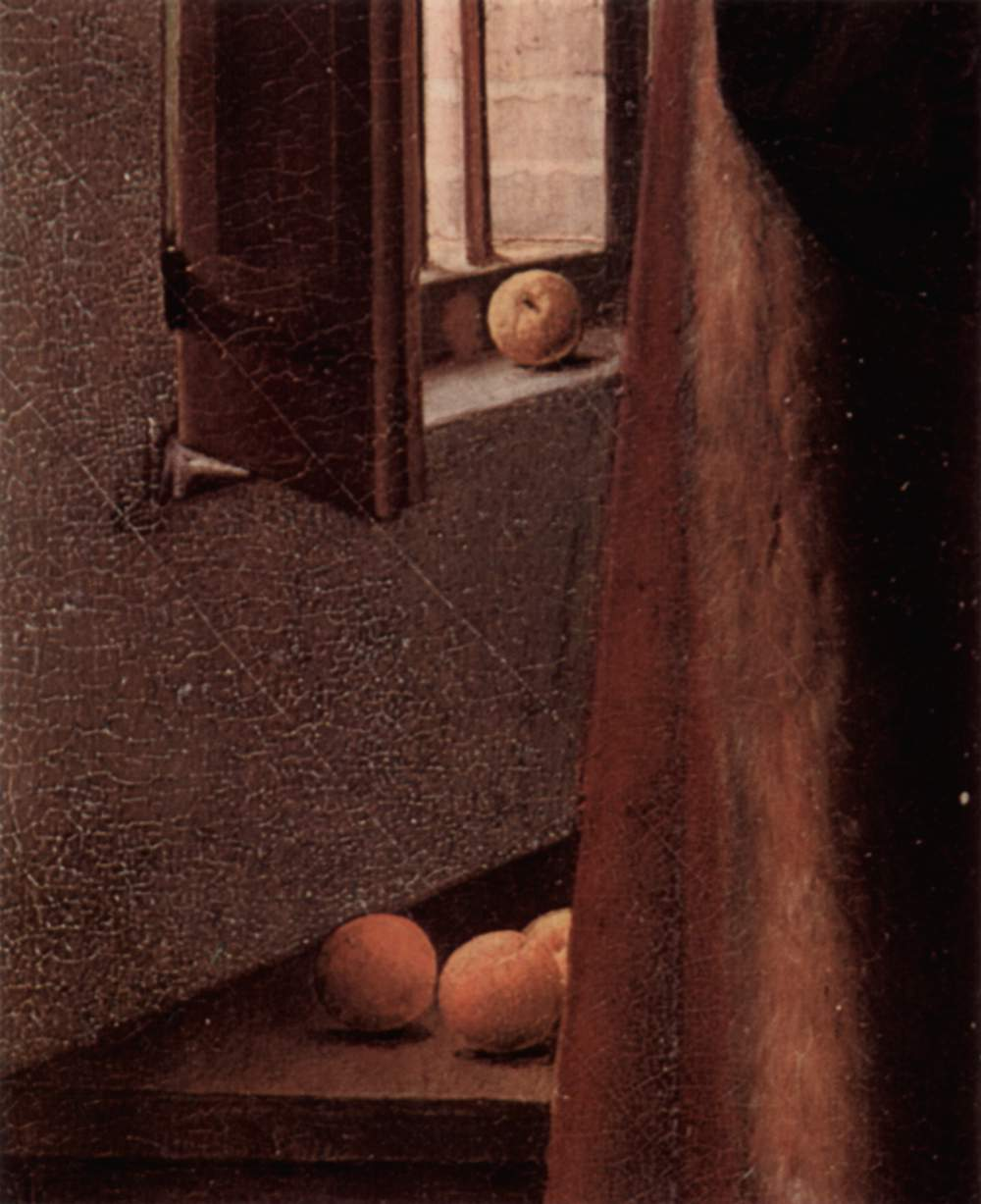
Detail of the Arnolfini Portrait by Jan van Eyck, 1434

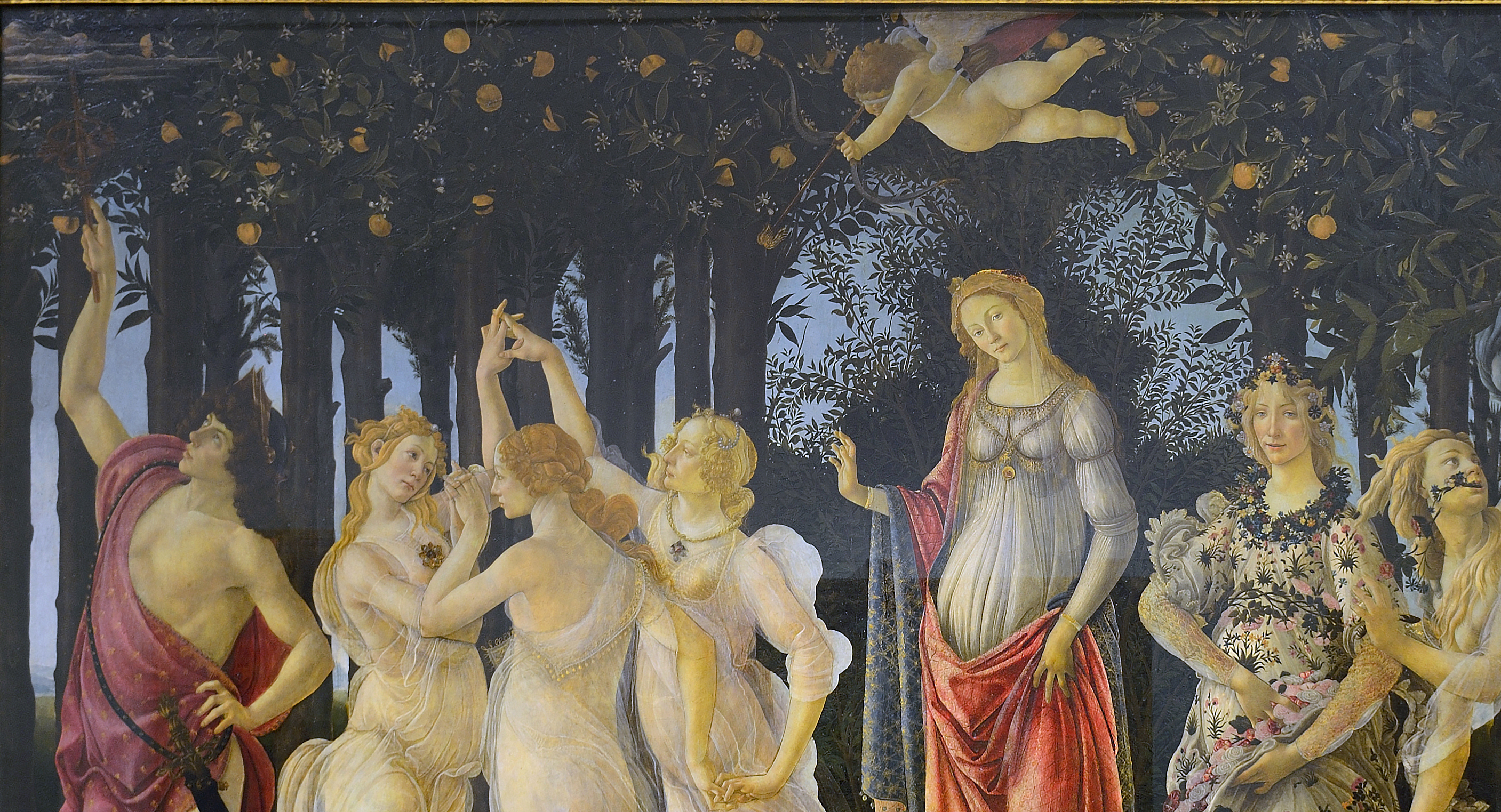
Detail of Primavera by Sandro Botticelli, 1482, set in an orange grove

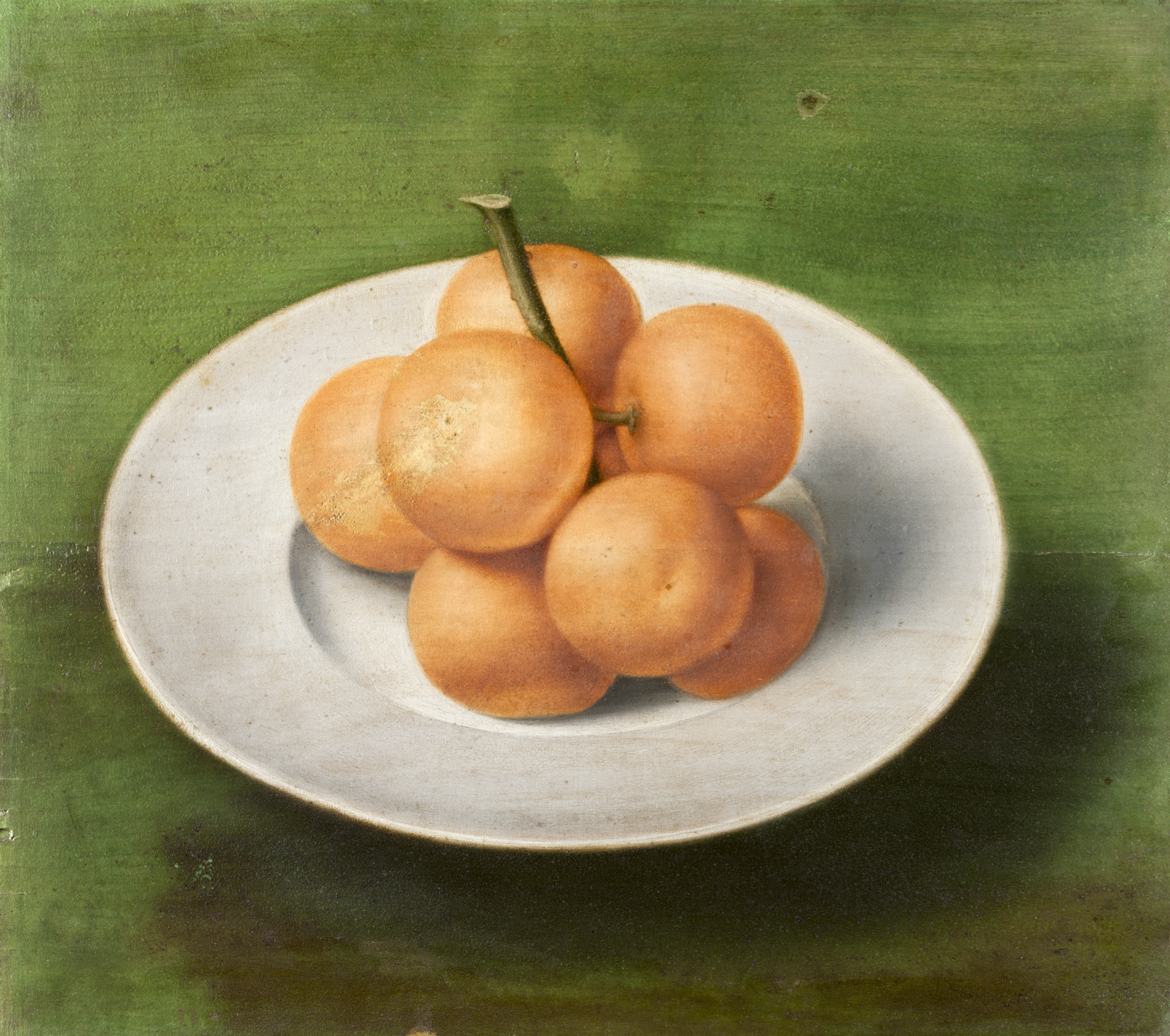
Still life with oranges on a plate. Possibly Jacques Linard or Louise Moillon, 1640

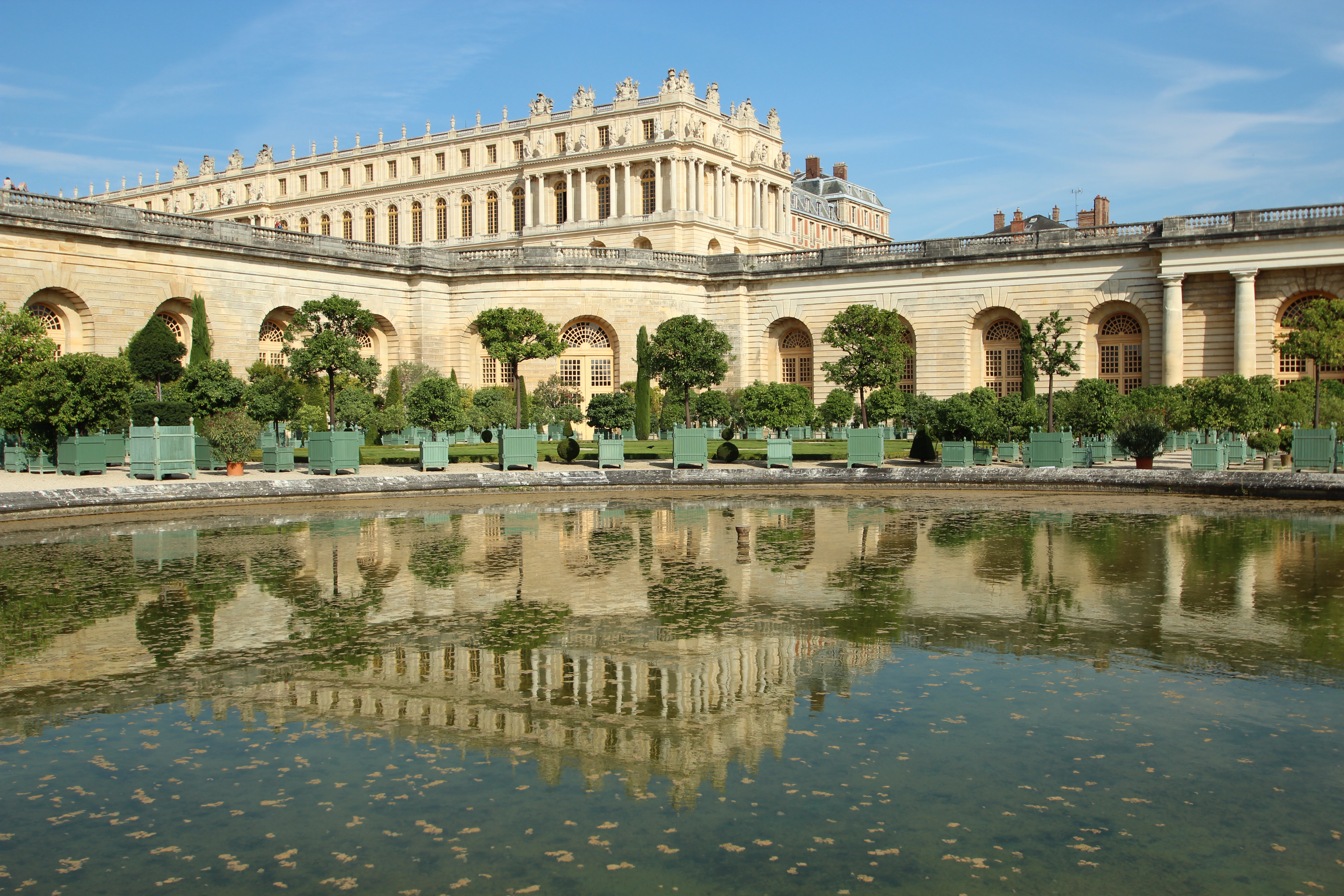
The Versailles Orangerie, 1686

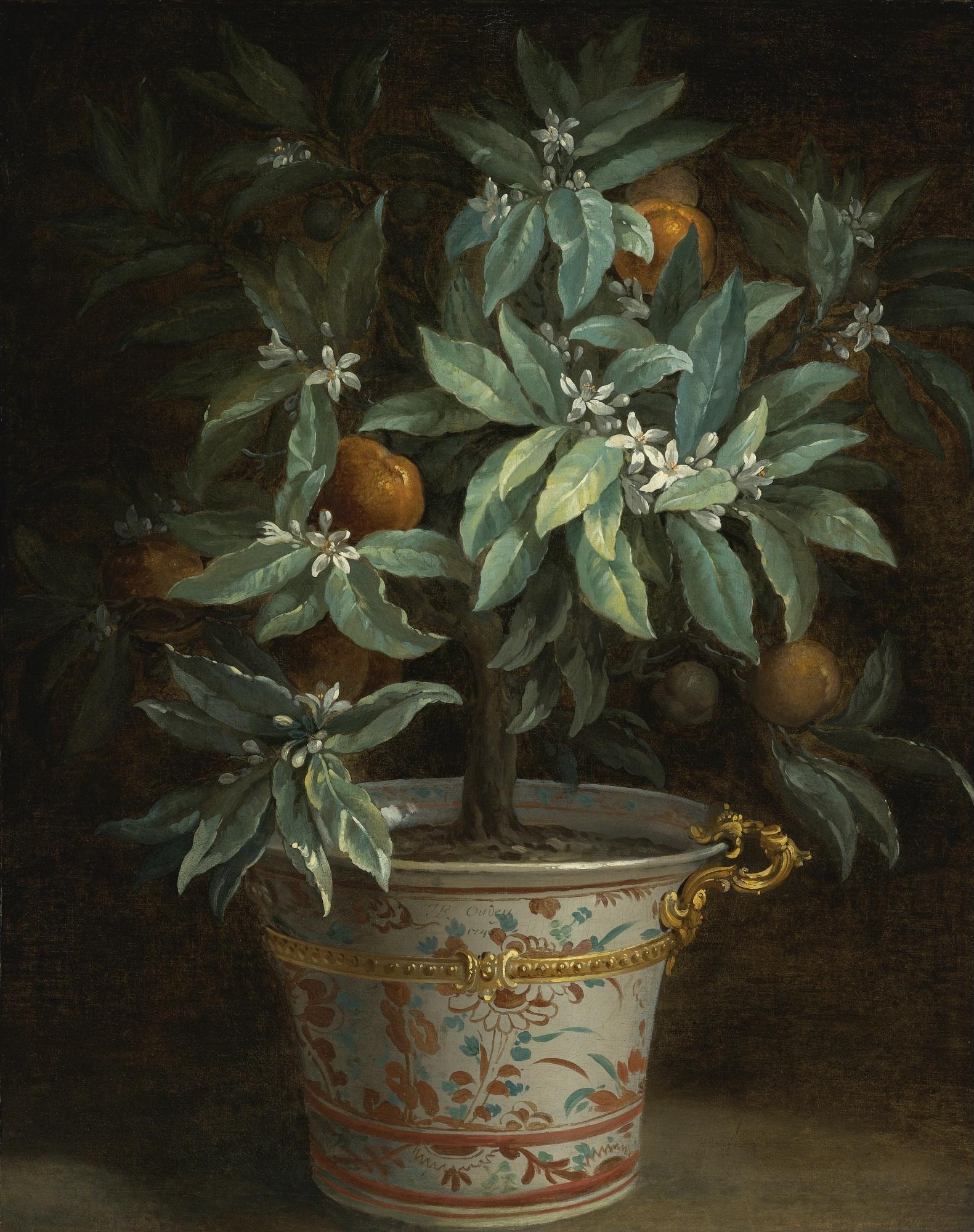
Jean-Baptiste Oudry, The Orange Tree, 1740

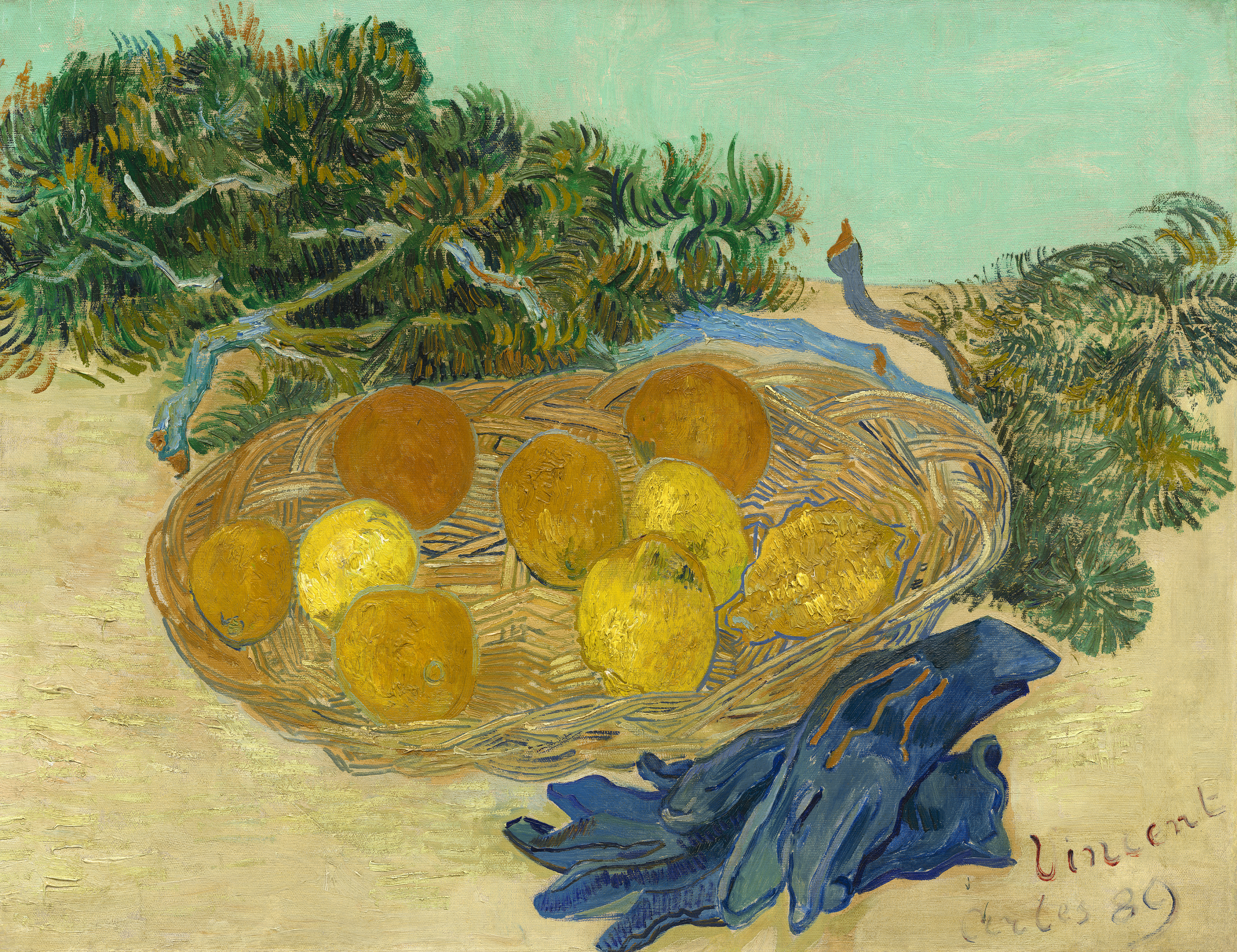
Still Life of Oranges and Lemons with Blue Gloves by Vincent van Gogh, 1889

== See also ==
- List of citrus fruits
- List of culinary fruits
