= Blood orange =

Variety of orange with dark red flesh

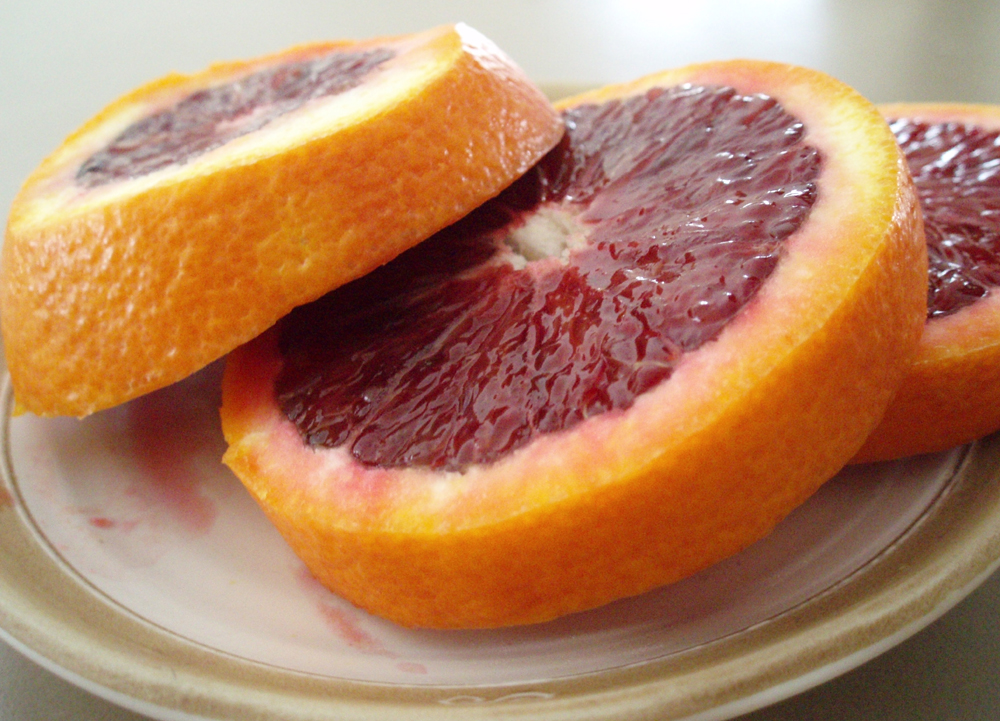
- A sliced blood orange
- Species: Citrus × sinensis
- Cultivar group: Blood orange cultivars
- Origin: Southern Mediterranean, 18th century
- Cultivar group members: Tarocco (native to Italy); Moro (native to Sicily, Italy); Sanguinello (native to Spain)

The blood orange is a variety of orange with crimson flesh colored near or the same as blood. It is one of the sweet orange varieties (Citrus × sinensis). It is also known as the raspberry orange.

The dark flesh color is due to the presence of anthocyanins, a family of polyphenol pigments common to many flowers and fruit, but uncommon in citrus fruits. Chrysanthemin (cyanidin 3-O-glucoside) is the main compound found in red oranges. The flesh develops its characteristic red color when the fruit develops with low temperatures during the night. Sometimes, dark coloring is seen on the exterior of the rind as well. This depends on the variety of blood orange. The skin can be tougher and harder to peel than that of other oranges. Blood oranges have a unique flavor compared to other oranges, being distinctly raspberry-like in addition to the usual citrus notes. The anthocyanin pigments of blood oranges begin accumulating in the vesicles at the edges of the segments, and at the blossom end of the fruit, and continue accumulating in cold storage after harvest.

The blood orange is a natural mutation of the orange, which is itself a hybrid, probably between the pomelo and the tangerine. Within Europe, the arancia rossa di Sicilia (red orange of Sicily) has protected geographical status. In the Valencian Community, it was introduced in the second half of the 19th century.

== Cultivars ==
The three most common types of blood oranges are the Tarocco (native to Italy), the Sanguinello (native to Spain), and the very dark Moro (native to Italy), the newest variety of the three. Other less-common types include Maltaise demi sanguine, Washington Sanguine, Ruby, Doblafina, Delfino, Burris Valencia, Vaccaro, Grosse Ronde, Entrefina, and Sanguinello a Pignu.

While also pigmented, Cara Cara navels and Vainiglia sanguignos have pigmentation based on lycopene, not anthocyanins as blood oranges do.

=== Moro ===
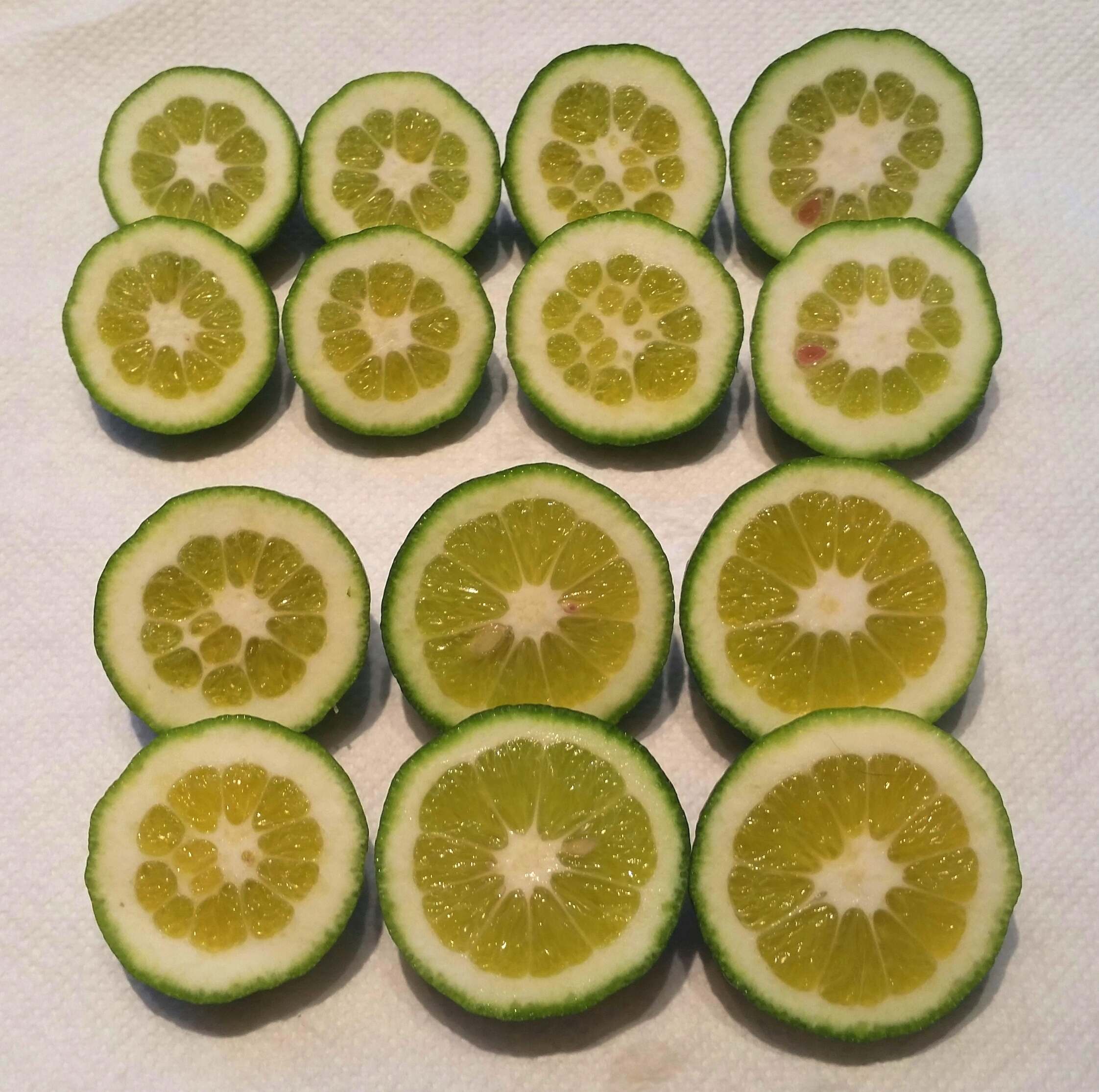
Immature 'Moro' blood orange fruit – 7 months from flowering

The Moro is the most colorful of the blood oranges, with a deep red flesh and a rind with a bright red blush. The flavor is stronger and the aroma is more intense than a normal orange. This fruit has a distinct, sweet flavor with a hint of raspberry. This orange possesses a more bitter taste than the 'Tarocco' or the 'Sanguinello'. The 'Moro' variety is believed to have originated at the beginning of the 19th century in the citrus-growing area around Lentini (in the Province of Syracuse in Sicily, Italy) as a bud mutation of the "Sanguinello Moscato". The 'Moro' is a "deep blood orange", meaning that the flesh ranges from orange-veined with ruby coloration, to vermilion, to vivid crimson, to nearly black.

=== Tarocco ===
The name Tarocco is thought to be derived from an exclamation of wonder expressed by the farmer who was shown this fruit by its discoverer. It is a medium-sized fruit and is perhaps the sweetest and most flavorful of the three types. The most popular table orange in Italy, it is thought to have derived from a mutation of the 'Sanguinello'. It is referred to as "half-blood", because the flesh is not accentuated in red pigmentation as much as with the 'Moro' and 'Sanguinello' varieties. It has thin orange skin, slightly blushed in red tones. The Tarocco is one of the world's most popular oranges because of its sweetness (Brix to acid ratio is generally above 12.0) and juiciness. It has the highest vitamin C content of any orange variety grown in the world, mainly on account of the fertile soil surrounding Mount Etna, and it is easy to peel. The 'Tarocco' orange is seedless.

The University of California, Riverside Citrus Variety Collection has delineated three subcultivars of 'Tarocco'. The 'Bream Tarocco', which was originally donated by Robert Bream of Lindsay, California, is of medium to large fruit with few to no seeds. 'Tarocco #7', or 'CRC 3596 Tarocco', is known for its flavor, but has a rind with little to no coloration. The 'Thermal Tarocco' was donated by A. Newcomb of Thermal Plaza Nursery in Thermal, California.

=== Sanguinello ===
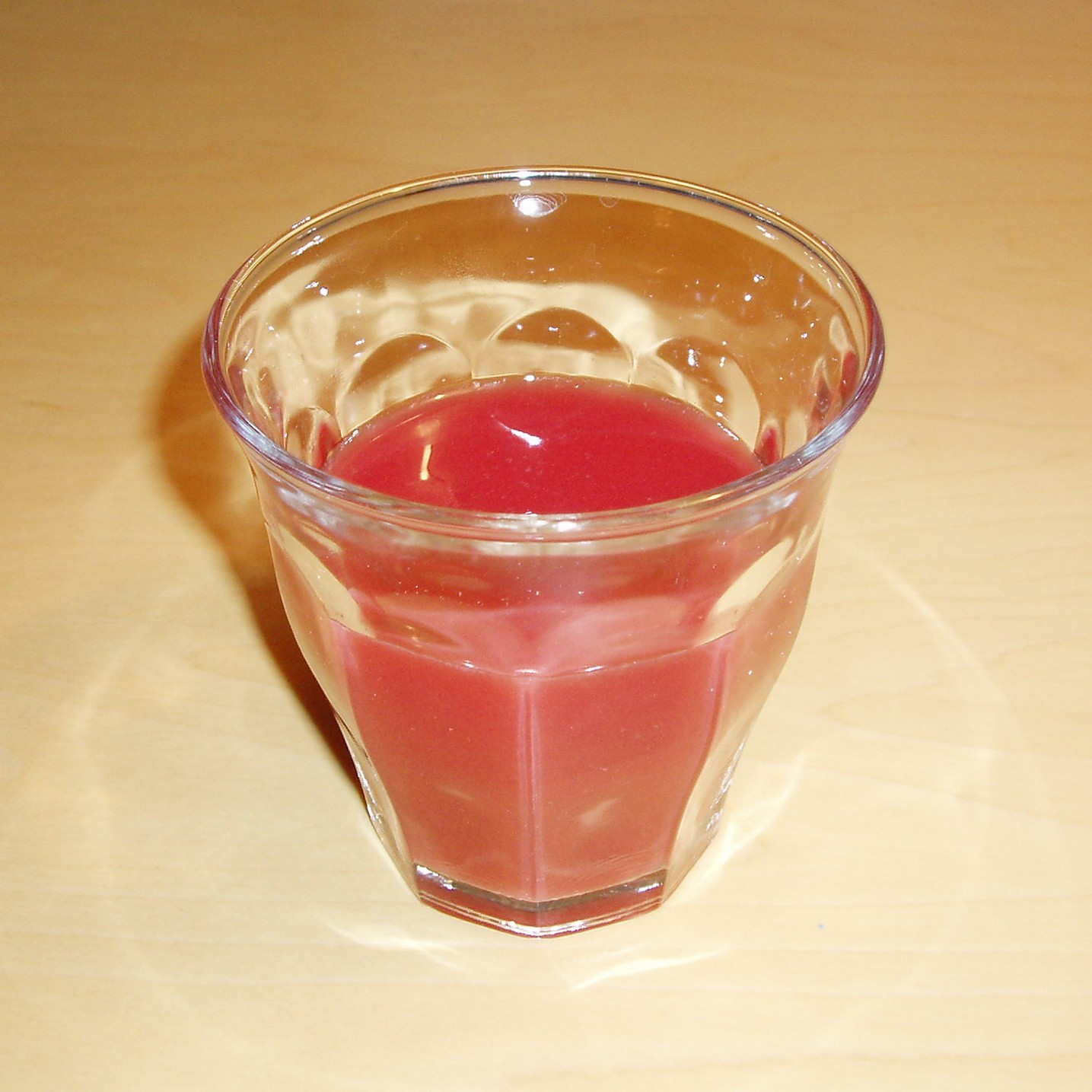
A glass of Sanguinello juice

The Sanguinello /sæŋɡwɪˈnɛloʊ/, also called Sanguinelli in the US (the plural form of its name in Italian), discovered in Spain in 1929, has reddish skin, few seeds, and sweet, tender flesh. 'Sanguinello', the Sicilian late "full-blood" orange, is close in characteristics to the 'Moro'. Where grown in the Northern Hemisphere, it matures in February, but can remain on trees unharvested until April. Fruit can last until the end of May. The peel is compact, and clear yellow with a red tinge. The flesh is orange with multiple blood-colored streaks.

== History and background ==
Blood oranges may have originated in the southern Mediterranean, where they have been grown since the 18th century. They are a common orange grown in Italy. The anthocyanins – which give the orange its distinct maroon color – will only develop when temperatures are low at night, as during the Mediterranean fall and winter. Blood oranges cultivated in the United States are in season from December to March (Texas), and from November to May (California).

== As food ==
Some blood orange juice may be somewhat tart; other kinds are sweet while retaining the characteristic blood orange taste. The oranges can also be used to create marmalade, and the zest can be used for baking. A popular Sicilian winter salad is made with sliced blood oranges, sliced bulb fennel, and olive oil. The oranges have also been used to create gelato, sorbet, and Italian soda.

=== Nutrition ===
Raw blood oranges are a rich source of vitamin C, vitamin A, potassium, manganese, anthocyanins, antioxidants, and dietary fiber.

== Gallery ==
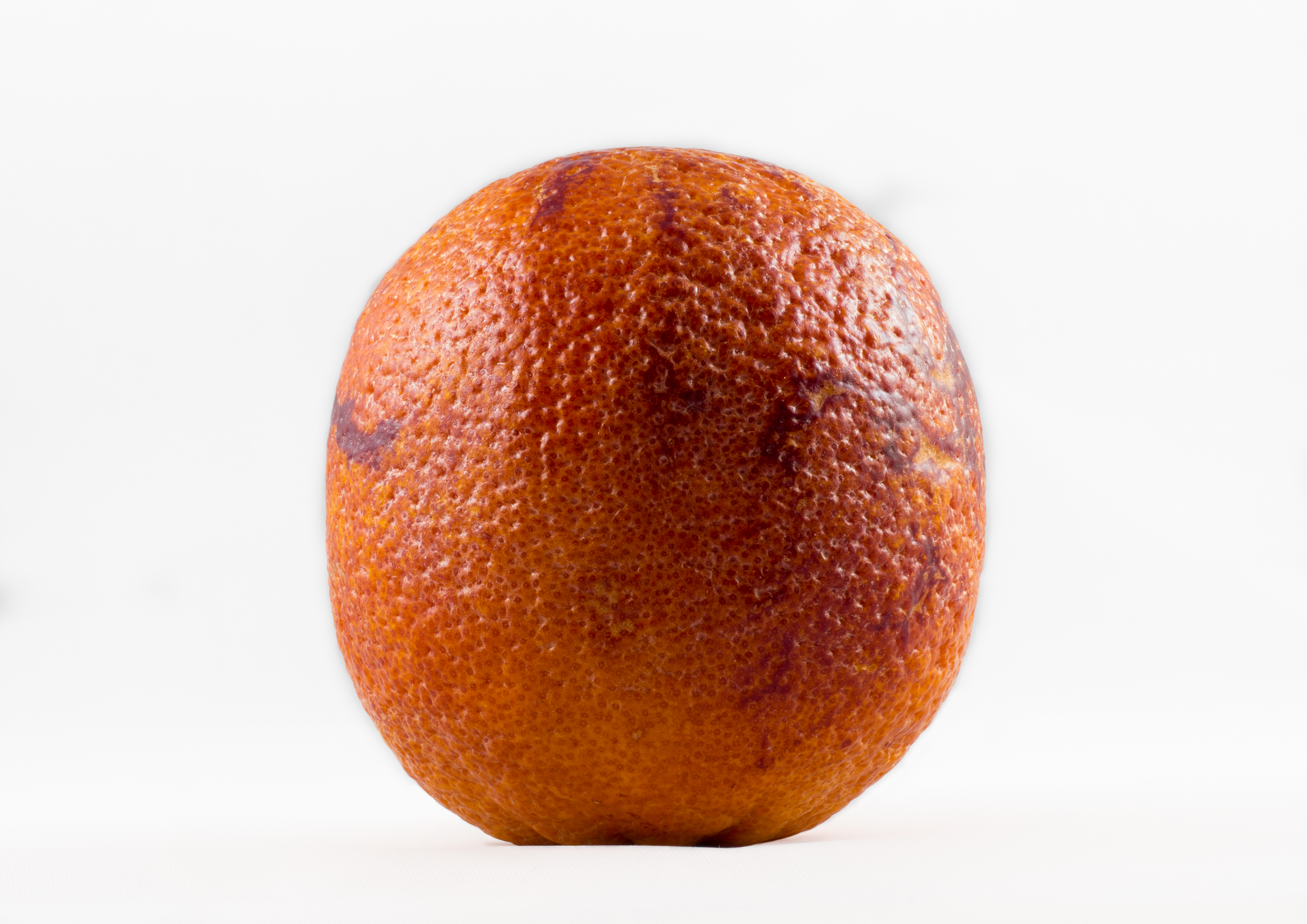
A ripe blood orange, unpeeled

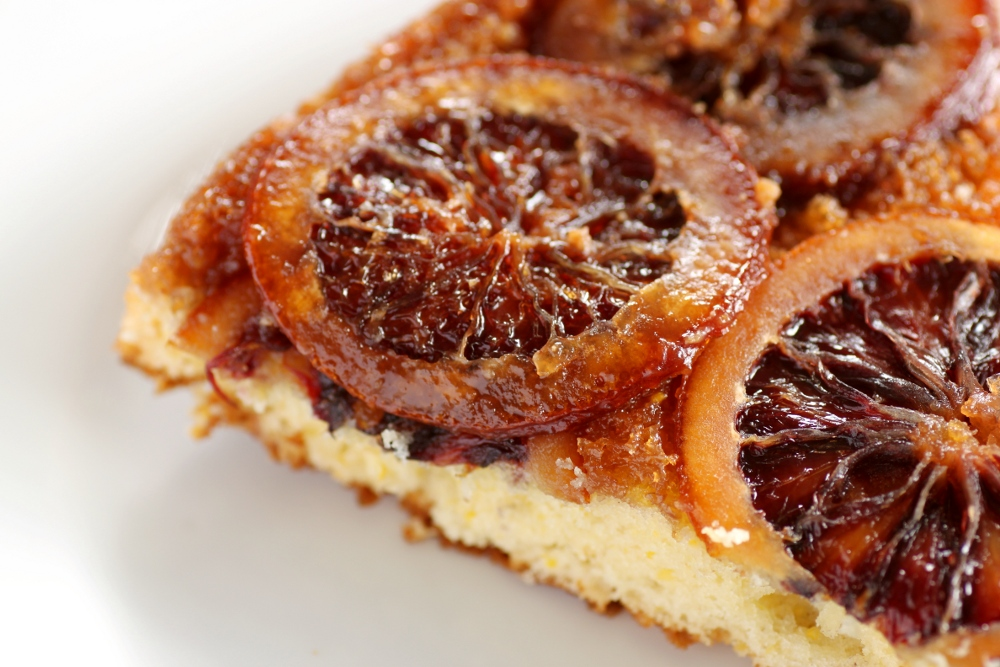
A slice of blood orange upside-down cake

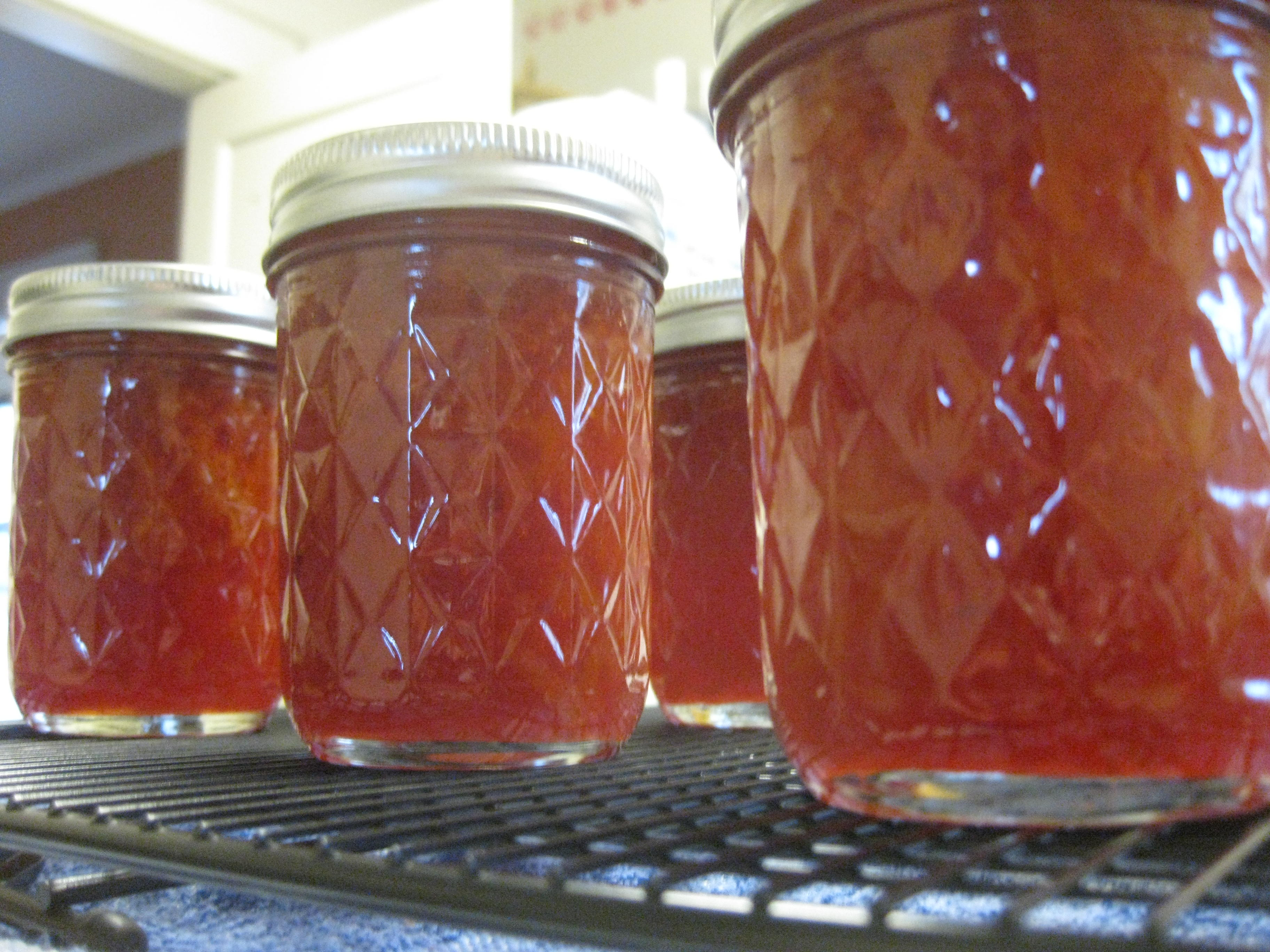
Jars of blood orange marmalade

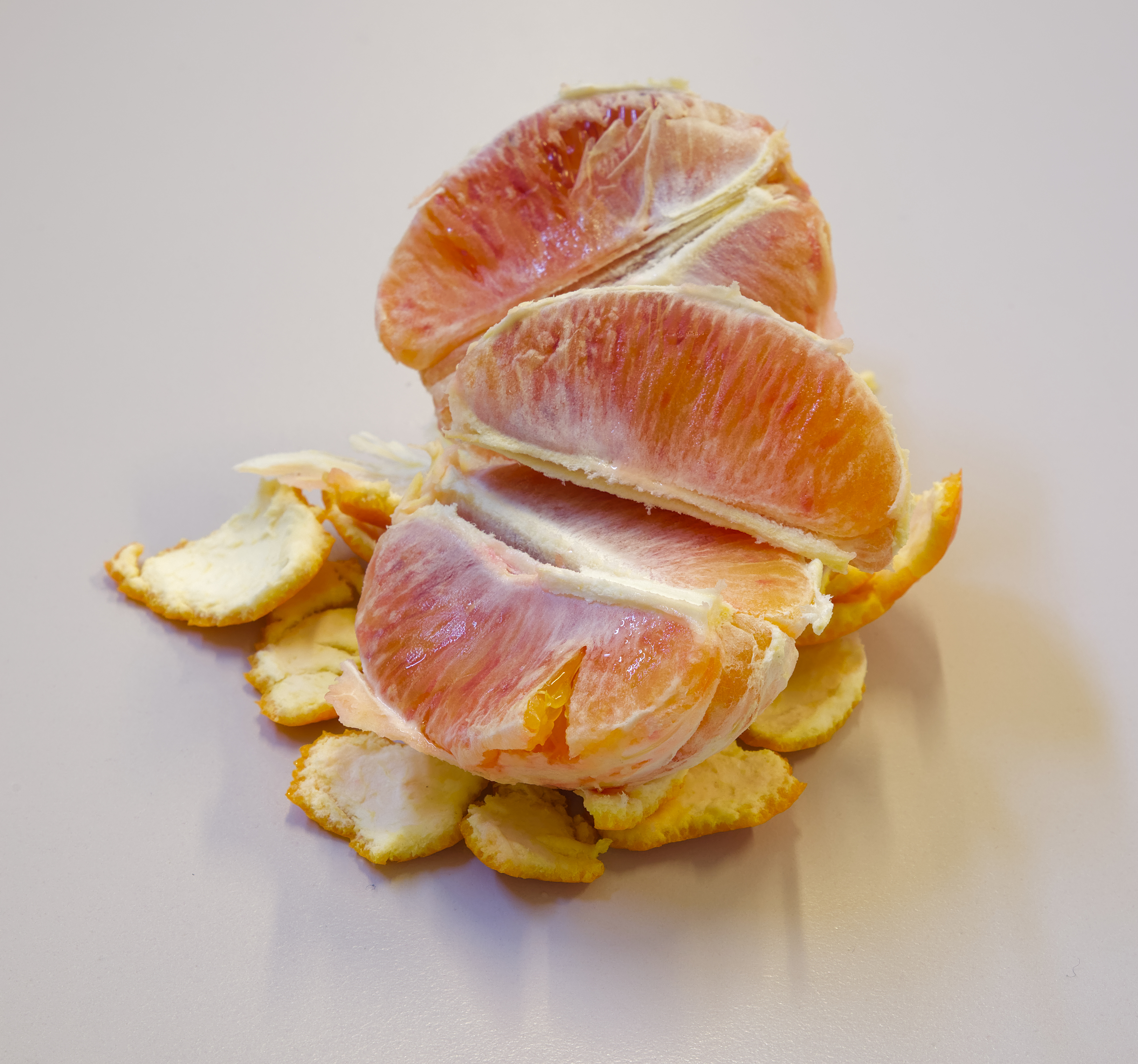
A peeled blood orange

== See also ==
- Cara Cara navel, a different type of red-fleshed orange
