= Chocolate navel orange =

Type of Navel orange, a mutation that was first discovered in 2006

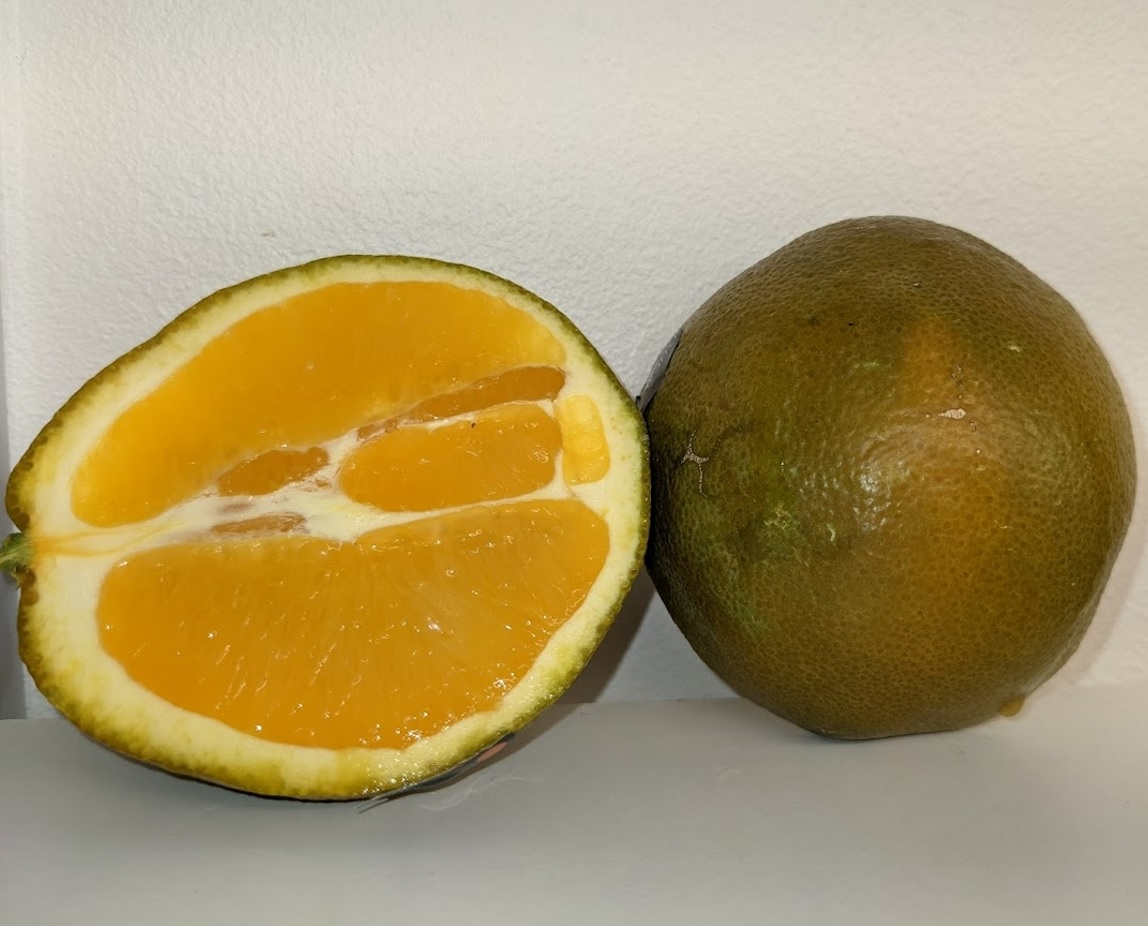
A chocolate navel orange split in half

Chocolate navel orange, also called chocolate orange, is a type of navel orange, a mutation that was first discovered in 2006 in Valencia, Spain. The name "chocolate orange" is based on the brown color of the peel. The taste is sweeter than normal oranges, with chocolate navel oranges averaging 12 Brix in sugar content. Chocolate navel oranges are also less sour to the taste compared to regular oranges.

As of December 2021 only three orange cultivators were growing chocolate navel oranges, all in Spain. The season is generally short and they are generally significantly more expensive compared to regular oranges. They are harvested from December to January or February.
