= Navel orange =

Orange cultivar

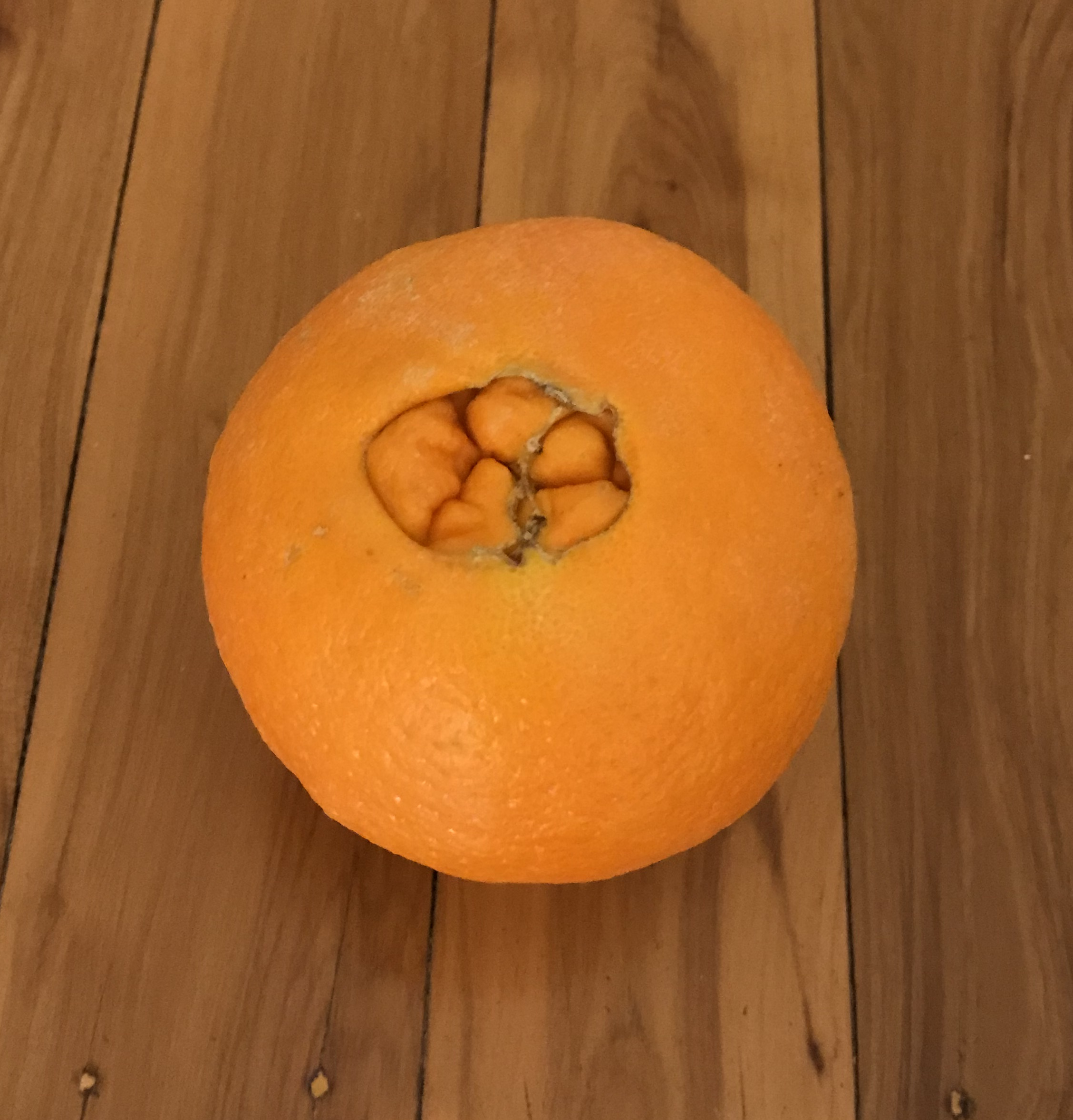
A navel orange, showing the navel section

The navel orange is a variety of orange with a characteristic second fruit at the apex, which protrudes slightly like a human navel. This variety first was caused by a mutation in an orange tree, and first appeared in the early 19th century at a monastery in Bahia, Brazil. The mutation caused the orange to develop a second fruit at its base, opposite the stem, embedded within the peel of the primary orange. This mutation also caused it to be seedless, meaning the only way the plant can be propagated is by cutting and grafting.

Navel oranges are mainly an eating fruit because they are seedless and their thicker skin makes them easy to peel. They are also less suitable for juice than other orange varieties as they are less juicy, and because their flesh contains limonin, which becomes bitter when exposed to air.

== History ==
The navel orange originated in Bahia, Brazil in the 1810s or 1820s. This variety was likely the Portuguese navel orange or Umbigo described by Antoine Risso and Pierre Antoine Poiteau in their 1818–1822 book Histoire naturelle des orangers ("Natural History of Orange Trees"). Because of the perceived superiority of this new cultivar, the orange was introduced to Australia in 1824 and Florida in 1835.

In the 1870s, the newly formed United States Department of Agriculture (USDA) imported twelve navel orange trees from Brazil to Washington, D.C. Two of these cuttings were sent to Eliza Tibbets in 1873, who planted them in Riverside, California, where the fruit became known as "Washington".

== Varieties ==
The Cara Cara is a type of navel orange grown mainly in Venezuela, South Africa and California's San Joaquin Valley. It is sweet and low in acid, with distinctively pinkish red flesh. It was discovered at the Hacienda Cara Cara in Valencia, Venezuela, in 1976.

The Chocolate navel orange, also called the brown sugar orange, is a type of navel orange that was first discovered in 2006 in Valencia, Spain. The name "chocolate orange" is based on the brown colour of the peel. The taste is sweeter than normal oranges, with chocolate navel oranges averaging 12 Brix in sugar content. Chocolate navel oranges are also less sour to the taste compared to regular oranges.
