= Cara Cara navel orange =

Orange cultivar

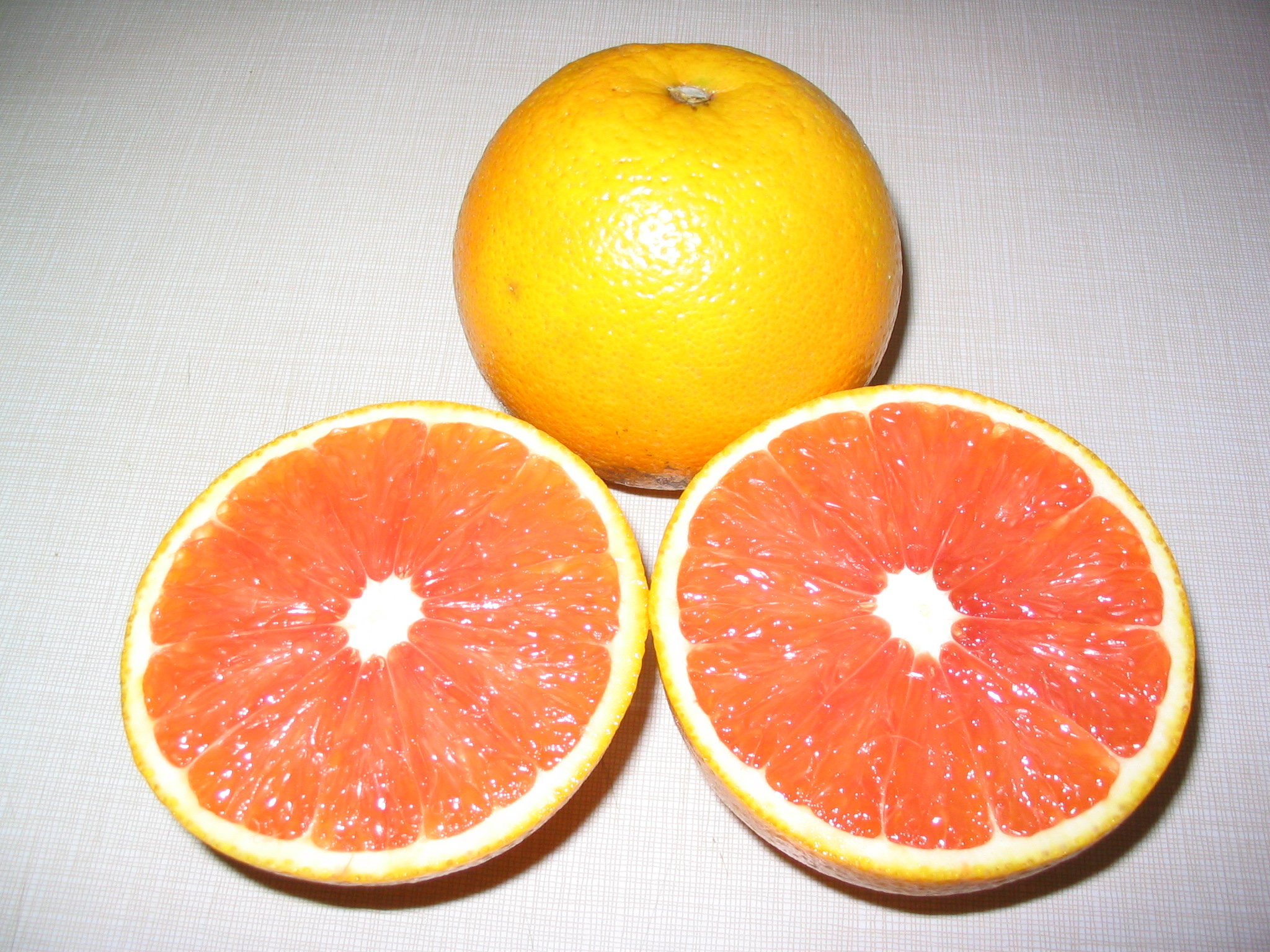
- Species: Citrus × sinensis
- Cultivar: 'Cara Cara'
- Marketing names: Power Orange
- Origin: Hacienda de Cara Cara

The Cara Cara navel orange, or red-fleshed navel orange, is an early-to-midseason navel orange noted for its pinkish-to-reddish-orange flesh.

It is believed to have developed as a spontaneous bud mutation on a "standard" Washington navel orange tree. A botanical sport discovered at the Hacienda Caracara in Valencia, Venezuela, in 1976, the Cara Cara appears to be of such uncertain parentage as to occasionally warrant the distinction of a mutation, with only the tree on which it was found—the Washington navel—being an accepted progenitor. Cara Caras did not enter the U.S. consumer produce market until the late 1980s and were carried only by specialty markets for many years thereafter.

== Characteristics ==
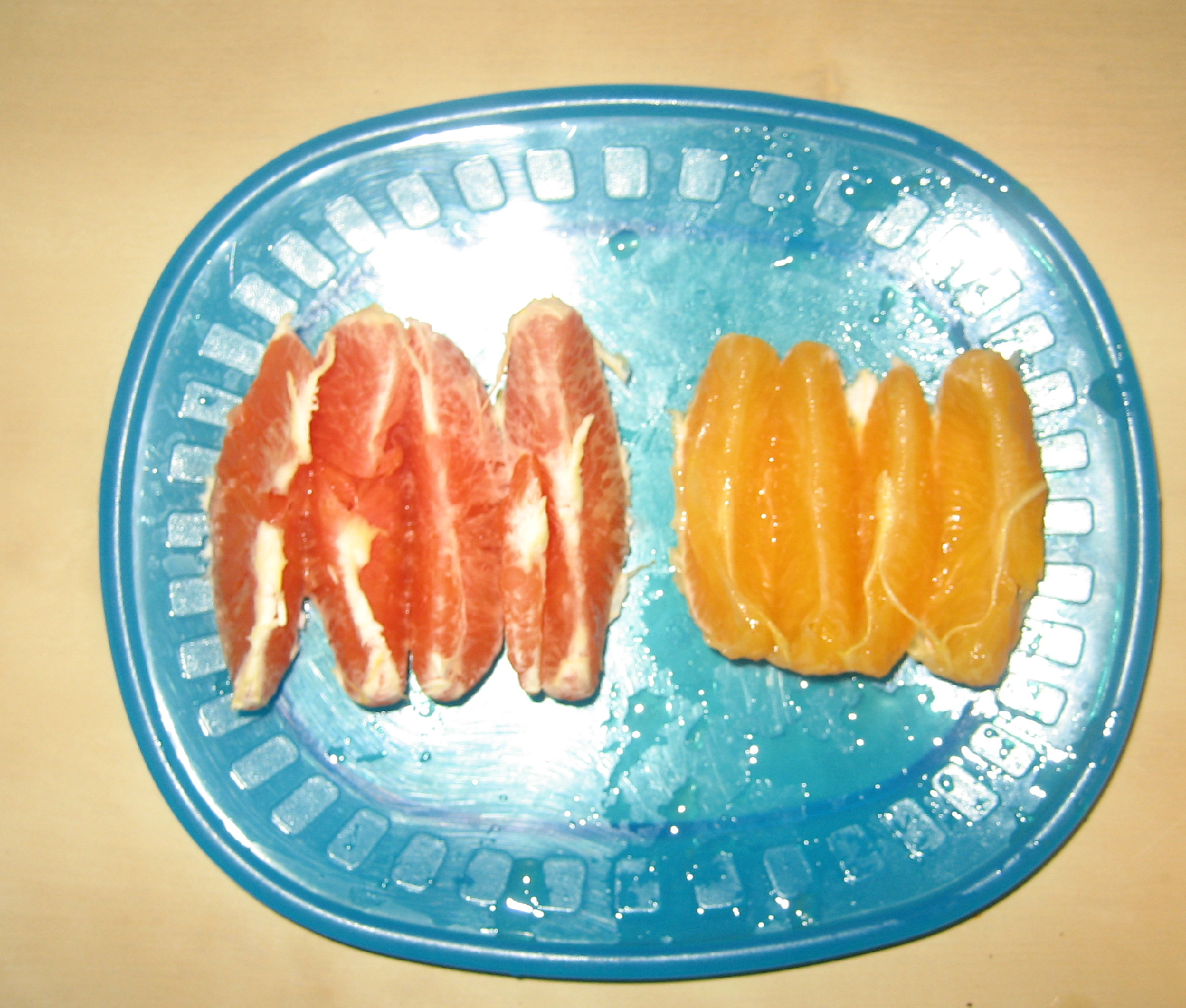
Cara Cara orange slices, on the left, compared to ordinary navel orange slices, on the right

This medium-sized navel is seedless, sweet and low in acid. It is characterized by little to no pith and easy, clean separation from the rind.

Unlike in true blood oranges, where the main pigmentation is due to anthocyanins, pigmentation in Cara Cara oranges is due to carotenoids, such as lycopene.

== Season ==
From the major growing regions, South American Cara Caras are ready for market starting in August, whereas Venezuelan fruits arrive in October and California fruits make their seasonal debut in late November and are available through April.
