= Tibbits =

Tibbits may refer to:

== People with the surname ==
- Alice Tibbits (1854–1932), South Australian nursing pioneer, matron and hospital owner
- Annie O. Tibbits (1871–1957), English journalist and author
- Charles John Tibbits (1861–1935), English journalist, newspaper editor, author, and legal writer
- George Mortimer Tibbits (1796–1878), American landowner, livestock farmer and art connoisseur
- George Tibbits (1763–1849), American politician and a member of the United States House of Representatives from New York
- George Tibbits (composer) (1933–2008), Australian composer and architect
- James Tibbits Willmore (1800–1863), English engraver
- Janet Tibbits (born 1967), Australian swimmer
- John A. Tibbits (1844–1893), American politician and newspaper publisher
- Richard Tibbits (1846–1924), insurance agent and political figure in New Brunswick, Canada
- Skylar Tibbits, American designer and computer scientist known for his work on self-assembly and 4d printing
- Stephanie Tibbits (born 1975), Canadian former professional tennis player
- William Badger Tibbits (1837–1880), officer in the Union Army during the American Civil War

=== Fictional characters ===
- Benjamin "Benny" Tibbits or Flux (comics), fictional gamma empowered soldier in the Marvel Comics universe

== Buildings ==
- Tibbits House, also known as Tibbits Hall, a historic home at Hoosick in Rensselaer County, New York
- Tibbits Opera House, the second oldest theatre in Michigan, having been built in 1882
- Tibbits Hall, residence building on UNB Fredericton campus, New Brunswick, Canada

== Other ==
- Tibbits Brook, stream in Sherburne County, in the U.S. state of Minnesota

== See also ==
- Tebbit
- Tibbets (disambiguation)
- Tibbetts (disambiguation)
