= Tebbitt =

Tebbitt is a surname. Notable people with the surname include:

- Sir Alfred Tebbitt (1871–1941), French-British businessman
- Gilbert Tebbitt (1908–1993), English cricketer
- Henri Tebbitt (1854–1927), English-Australian painter

== See also ==
- Tebbit, a surname
- Tebbutt
