= Crowne Plaza Fredericton – Lord Beaverbrook =

Hotel in Fredericton, Canada

Lord Beaverbrook Hotel

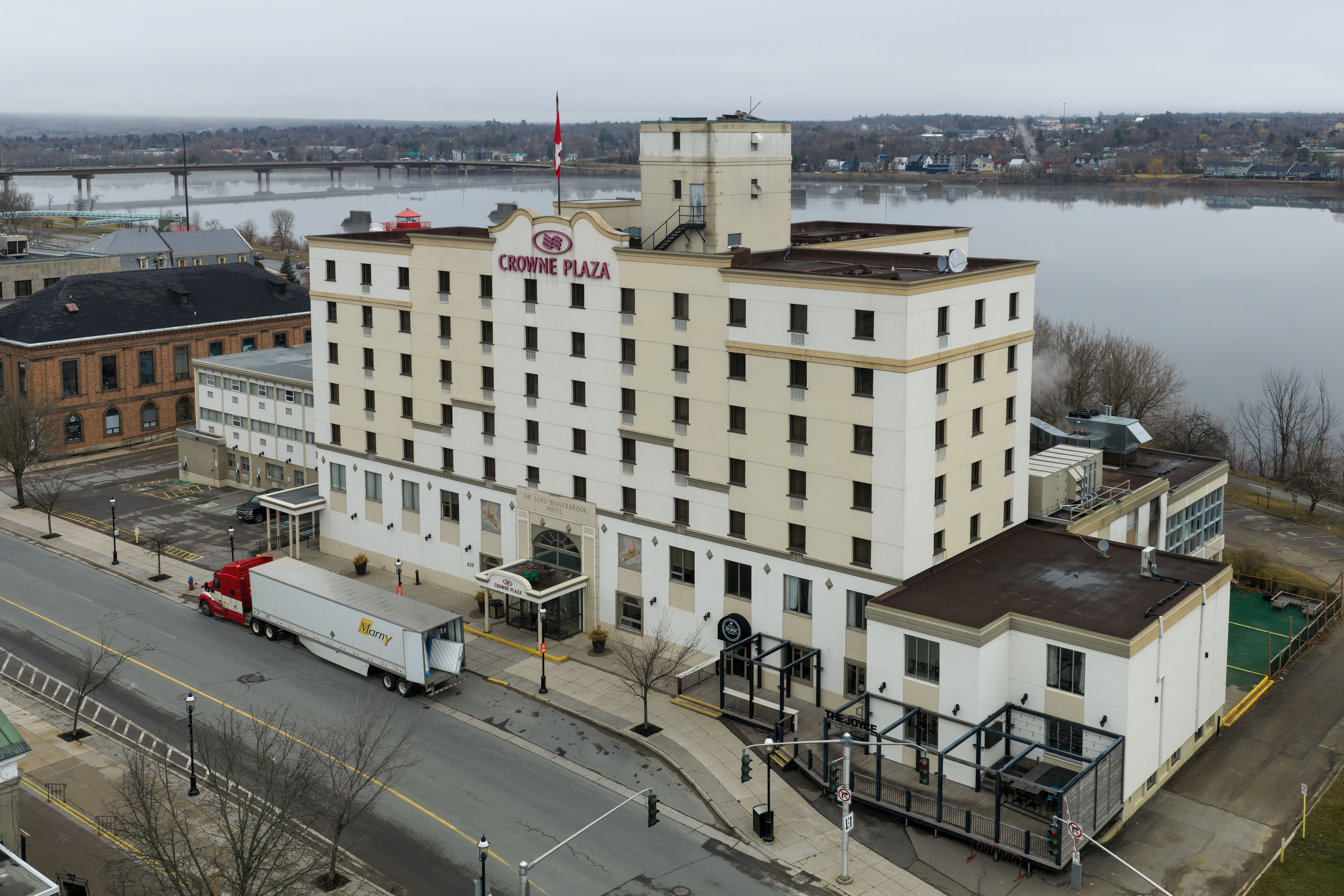
- The hotel in 2026
- Interactive map of the Lord Beaverbrook Hotel area

General information
- Location: 659 Queen Street, Fredericton, New Brunswick, Canada
- Coordinates: 45.9606°N 66.6371°W
- Opening: 1948
- Owner: Aquilini Properties LP
- Operator: Crowne Plaza (IHG)

Other information
- Number of rooms: 168
- Number of restaurants: 2

Website
- www.ihg.com/crowneplaza/hotels/us/en/fredericton/yfcqs/hoteldetail

Crowne Plaza Fredericton – Lord Beaverbrook is a downtown hotel in Fredericton, New Brunswick, overlooking the Saint John River. It opened in 1948 as the Lord Beaverbrook Hotel and was named for Max Aitken, 1st Baron Beaverbrook, a New Brunswick–born newspaper proprietor and politician. The property stands beside the Beaverbrook Art Gallery and near the Fredericton Playhouse, forming part of the city's riverfront cultural and hospitality district.

== History ==
Construction of the hotel began in 1946 on a site along Queen Street overlooking the river. It opened in mid-1948 as the Lord Beaverbrook Hotel, with an inaugural celebration described as one of the social events of the year in New Brunswick and attended by dignitaries connected to Beaverbrook's philanthropic work. The hotel quickly became a landmark and a venue for banquets, civic receptions, and visiting political figures.

In the early 2000s the property was acquired by Aquilini Properties, a division of the Vancouver-based Aquilini Group. The owners undertook a major refurbishment and reopened the hotel in 2006, rebranded under the Crowne Plaza flag as Crowne Plaza Fredericton – Lord Beaverbrook. Renovations included upgraded guest rooms, reconfigured meeting and ballroom spaces, and new food-and-beverage outlets.

The building and its association with Lord Beaverbrook continue to feature in local historical writing and heritage interpretation, including museum exhibitions and academic work on Fredericton's mid-20th-century urban development.

== Features ==
The hotel is seven storeys and contains 168 guestrooms and suites. Public spaces include a ballroom with river views, smaller meeting rooms, and approximately 10,000 square feet of function space used for conferences, weddings, and government events.

On the ground floor the hotel operates Maxwell’s, a restaurant facing the river, and the Joyce Pub, which emphasizes New Brunswick craft beer. Amenities include an indoor pool, hot tub, fitness facilities, and direct access to walking and cycling trails along the riverfront. Promotional and tourism literature frequently describe it as Fredericton's only downtown waterfront hotel and a local landmark.
