= Elk River (Minnesota) =

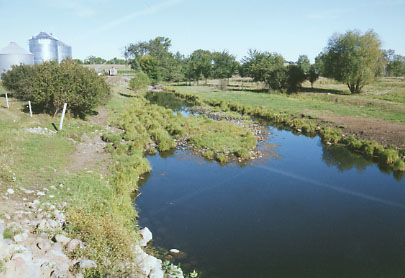
- The Elk River in Benton County in 2004

- Location of mouth

Location
- Country: United States
- State: Minnesota
- County: Benton

Physical characteristics
- Mouth
  - coordinates: 45.2980205°N 93.5724605°W
- Length: 84 mi (135 km)

Basin features
- River system: Mississippi River
- Tributaries
  - left: Tibbits Brook

The Elk River is an 84.0-mile-long (135.2 km) river in east-central Minnesota in the United States. It is a tributary of the Mississippi River, draining a watershed of 630 square miles (1,600 km^{2}).

== Course ==
The Elk River rises in northern Benton County, Minnesota and initially flows generally southward. In Sherburne County the river turns southeastward, paralleling the Mississippi River for the remainder of its course, past the communities of Becker and Big Lake. In his 1843 map of the Upper Mississippi, Joseph Nicollet recorded this river as "Kabitawi R[iver]", reflecting Gaa-biitawi-ziibi ("the parallelling river") in the Ojibwe) due to this parallel course with the Mississippi. It joins the Mississippi at the city of Elk River, after passing through Orono Lake, which is formed by a municipal hydroelectric dam.

At Big Lake, the river measures approximately 285 cubic feet per second.

== Tributaries ==
In Sherburne County's Big Lake Township, the Elk collects the St. Francis River and the Snake River; the latter is a minor stream which flows for its entire length in Sherburne County, generally southward through Santiago, Becker and Big Lake Townships in a straightened and channelized course.

== See also ==
- List of rivers of Minnesota
