= The Vineyard =

The Vineyard may refer to:

- The Vineyard (film), a 1989 film starring James Hong
- The Vineyard (magazine), a magazine published in London, England from 1910 to 1922
- The Vineyard (Bel Air, Maryland), listed on the US National Register of Historic Places
- The Vineyard, Fulham, a Grade II listed house in Fulham, London, England
- The Vineyard Hotel, Newlands, Cape Town, South Africa
- The Vineyard Hotel, Newbury, Berkshire, England
- The Vineyard, Oxford, a house in Oxford, England
- The Vineyard, Dublin, a cricket ground in Dublin, Ireland
- The Vineyard, Richmond, a street in Richmond, London
- Association of Vineyard Churches
- Martha's Vineyard, an island in Massachusetts
- The Vineyard (American TV series), a 2013 reality show set on Martha's Vineyard
- The Vineyard (Spanish TV series), a 2021 limited series

== See also ==
- Vineyard (disambiguation)
