= George Tibbits (disambiguation) =

George Tibbits (1763–1849) was an American politician.

George Tibbits may also refer to:

- George Mortimer Tibbits (1796–1878), American livestock farmer, son of the above
- George Tibbits (composer) (1933–2008), Australian composer and architect

== See also ==
- George W. Tibbetts (1845–1924), merchant and hops farmer in Washington
