= Vineyard (disambiguation) =

A vineyard is a yard of grape vines.

Vineyard may also refer to:

== People ==
- Dave Vineyard (born 1941), American baseball player
- James Russell Vineyard (1801-1863), American politician

== Places ==
=== Australia ===
- Vineyard, New South Wales

=== Jamaica ===
- Vineyard Town, Kingston

=== United States ===
- Vineyard, California
- Vineyards, Florida
- Vineyard, Kentucky
- Vineyard, Utah
  - Vineyard (UTA station), a planned station for the commuter train FrontRunner
- Martha's Vineyard, an island off Massachusetts

== Religious ==
- Lord's Vineyard, a name given to the Christian Church; see, for example, Spiritual Exercises of Ignatius of Loyola
- Association of Vineyard Churches, also known as the "Vineyard Movement"
  - Vineyard Churches UK and Ireland, the national body for this movement in the United Kingdom and Ireland

== Science and technology ==
- Vineyard (Mathematics)

== See also ==
The Vineyard (disambiguation)
