= Max Aitken, 1st Baron Beaverbrook =

Anglo-Canadian business tycoon, politician, and writer (1879–1964)

The Right Honourable The Lord Beaverbrook PC ONB
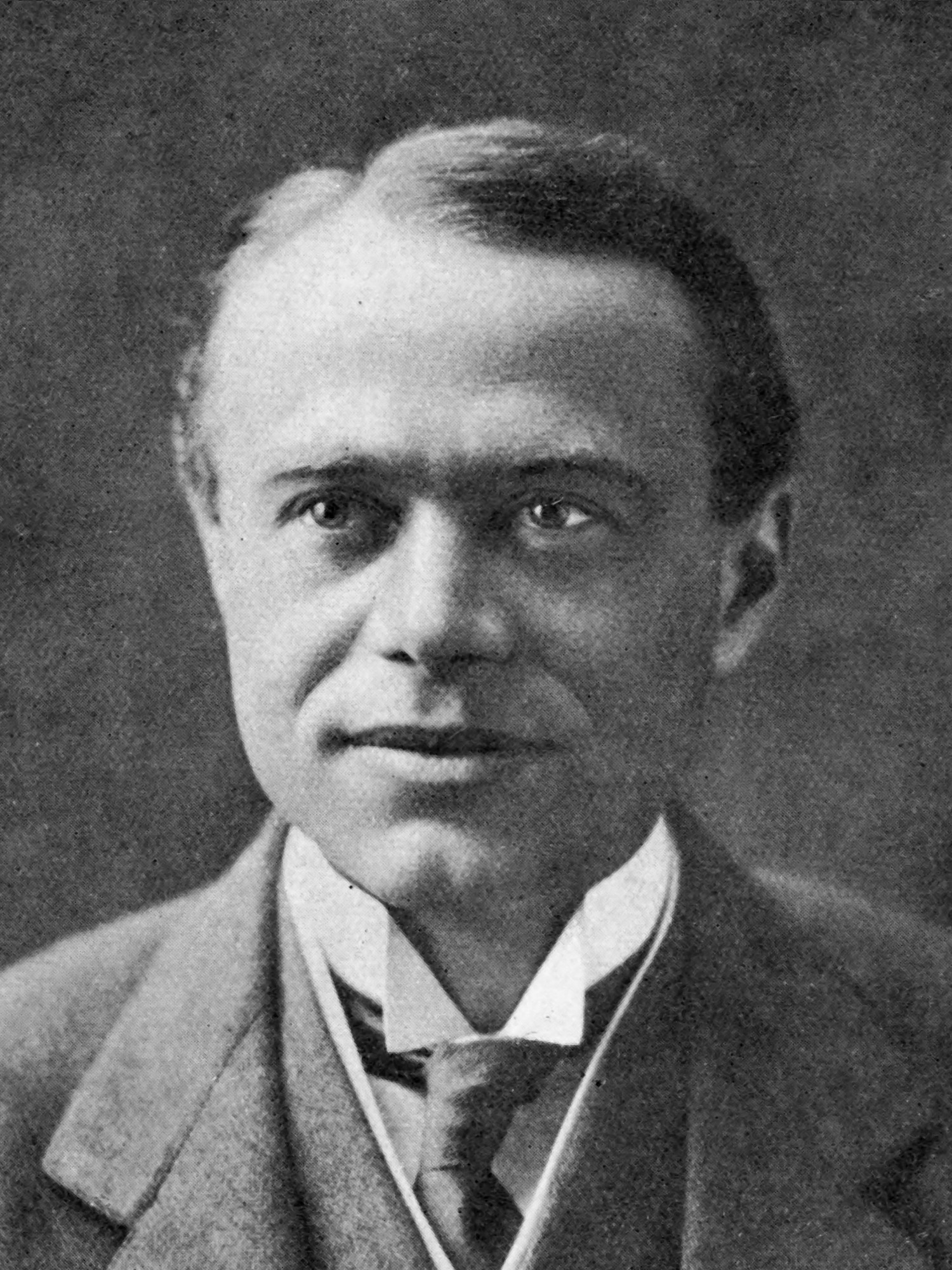
- Lord Beaverbrook c. 1918

Lord Keeper of the Privy Seal
- In office 24 September 1943 – 27 July 1945
- Prime Minister: Winston Churchill
- Preceded by: Viscount Cranborne
- Succeeded by: Arthur Greenwood

Minister of War Production
- In office 4–19 February 1942
- Prime Minister: Winston Churchill
- Preceded by: Office created
- Succeeded by: Oliver Lyttelton (as Minister of Production)

Minister of Supply
- In office 29 June 1941 – 4 February 1942
- Prime Minister: Winston Churchill
- Preceded by: Andrew Duncan
- Succeeded by: Andrew Duncan

Minister of Aircraft Production
- In office 14 May 1940 – 1 May 1941
- Prime Minister: Winston Churchill
- Preceded by: Office created
- Succeeded by: John Moore-Brabazon

Minister of Information
- In office 10 February – 4 November 1918
- Prime Minister: David Lloyd George
- Preceded by: Office created
- Succeeded by: The Lord Downham

Chancellor of the Duchy of Lancaster
- In office 10 February – 4 November 1918
- Prime Minister: David Lloyd George
- Preceded by: Sir Frederick Cawley
- Succeeded by: The Lord Downham

Member of the House of Lords Lord Temporal
- In office 2 January 1917 – 9 June 1964; Hereditary peerage
- Preceded by: Peerage created
- Succeeded by: The 2nd Lord Beaverbrook

Member of Parliament for Ashton under Lyne
- In office 3 December 1910 – 23 December 1916
- Preceded by: Alfred Scott
- Succeeded by: Albert Stanley

Personal details
- Born: William Maxwell Aitken; 25 May 1879 Maple, Ontario, Canada
- Died: 9 June 1964 (aged 85) Leatherhead, Surrey, England
- Party: Liberal Unionist; Conservative
- Spouses: Gladys Henderson Drury (m. 1906; died 1927) Marcia Anastasia Christoforides (m. 1963)
- Children: Janet Gladys Aitken; Sir Max Aitken, 2nd Baronet; Captain Peter Aitken
- Occupation: Legislator, author, entrepreneur

William Maxwell Aitken, 1st Baron Beaverbrook (25 May 1879 – 9 June 1964), was a Canadian-British newspaper publisher and backstage politician who was an influential figure in British media and politics of the first half of the 20th century. His base of power was the largest circulation newspaper in the world, the Daily Express, which appealed to the conservative working class with intensely patriotic news and editorials. During the Second World War, he played a major role in mobilising industrial resources as Winston Churchill's Minister of Aircraft Production.

The young Max Aitken had a gift for making money and was a millionaire by the age of 30. His business ambitions quickly exceeded opportunities in Canada, and he moved to Britain. There he befriended Andrew Bonar Law and with his support won a seat in the House of Commons at the December 1910 United Kingdom general election. A knighthood followed shortly after. During the First World War, he ran the Canadian Records office in London, and played a role in the removal of H. H. Asquith as prime minister in 1916. The resulting coalition government (with David Lloyd George as prime minister and Bonar Law as Chancellor of the Exchequer) rewarded Aitken with a peerage and, briefly, a Cabinet post as Minister of Information.

After the war, the now Lord Beaverbrook concentrated on his business interests. He built the Daily Express into the most successful mass-circulation newspaper in the world, with sales of 2.25 million copies a day across Britain. He used it to pursue personal campaigns, most notably for tariff reform and for the British Empire to become a free trade bloc. Beaverbrook supported the governments of Stanley Baldwin and Neville Chamberlain throughout the 1930s and was persuaded by another long-standing political friend, Winston Churchill, to serve as his Minister of Aircraft Production from May 1940. Churchill later praised his "vital and vibrant energy". He resigned due to ill-health in 1941 but later in the war was appointed Lord Privy Seal.

Beaverbrook spent his later life running his newspapers, which by then included the Evening Standard and the Sunday Express. He served as Chancellor of the University of New Brunswick and developed a reputation as a historian with his books on political and military history.

== Early life ==
Aitken was born in Maple, Ontario, Canada, in 1879, one of the ten children of William Cuthbert Aitken, a Scottish-born Presbyterian minister, (Note: William Cuthbert Aitken served under the Bounty or Augmentation Scheme, see Beaverbrook (1963), p. 107) and Jane (Noble), the daughter of a prosperous local farmer and storekeeper Joseph Vaughan Noble. When he was a year old, the family moved to Newcastle, New Brunswick, which Aitken later considered to be his hometown. It was here, at the age of 13, that he set up a school newspaper, The Leader. Whilst at school, he delivered newspapers, sold newspaper subscriptions and was the local correspondent for the St John Daily Star.

Aitken took the entrance examinations for Dalhousie University, but because he had declined to sit the Greek and Latin papers, he was refused entry. He registered at the King's College Law School, but left after a short while. This was to be his only formal higher education. Aitken worked in a shop, then borrowed some money to move to Chatham, New Brunswick, where he worked as a local correspondent for the Montreal Star, sold life insurance and collected debts. Aitken attempted to train as a lawyer and worked for a short time in the law office of R. B. Bennett, a future prime minister of Canada. Aitken managed Bennett's successful campaign for a place on Chatham town council. When Bennett left the law firm, Aitken moved to Saint John, New Brunswick, where he again sold life insurance before moving to Calgary where he helped to run Bennett's campaign for a seat in the legislative assembly of the North-West Territories in the 1898 general election. After an unsuccessful attempt to establish a meat business, Aitken returned to Saint John and to selling insurance.

== Early business career ==
In 1900, Aitken made his way to Halifax, Nova Scotia, where John F. Stairs, a member of the city's dominant business family, gave him employment and trained him in the business of finance. In 1904, when Stairs launched the Royal Securities Corporation, Aitken became a minority shareholder and the firm's general manager. Under the tutelage of Stairs, who would be his mentor and friend, Aitken engineered a number of successful business deals and was planning a series of bank mergers.

Stairs' unexpected early death in September 1904 led to Aitken acquiring control of the company and moving to Montreal, then the business capital of Canada. There he bought and sold companies, invested in stocks and shares and also developed business interests in both Cuba and Puerto Rico. He started a weekly magazine, the Canadian Century in 1910, invested in the Montreal Herald and almost acquired the Montreal Gazette. In 1907 he founded the Montreal Engineering Company. In 1909, also under the umbrella of his Royal Securities Company, Aitken founded the Calgary Power Company Limited, now the TransAlta Corporation, and oversaw the building of the Horseshoe Falls hydro station.

In 1910–1911 Aitken acquired a number of small regional cement plants in Canada, including Sir Sandford Fleming's Western Canada Cement Co. plant at Exshaw, Alberta, and amalgamated them into Canada Cement, eventually controlling four-fifths of the cement production in Canada. Canada was booming economically at the time, and Aitken had close to a monopoly on the material. There were irregularities in the stock transfers leading to the conglomeration of the cement plants, resulting in much criticism of Aitken, as well as accusations of price-gouging and poor management of the cement plants under his company's control. Aitken sold his shares, making a large amount of money.

Aitken had made his first visit to Britain in September 1908, and when he returned there in the spring of 1910, in an attempt to raise money to form a steel company, he decided to make the move permanent, but not before he led the underwriting, with a preponderance of British money, of an amalgamation of smaller units into the Steel Company of Canada. Very shortly later Aitken moved his family to the UK.

== Move to Britain ==
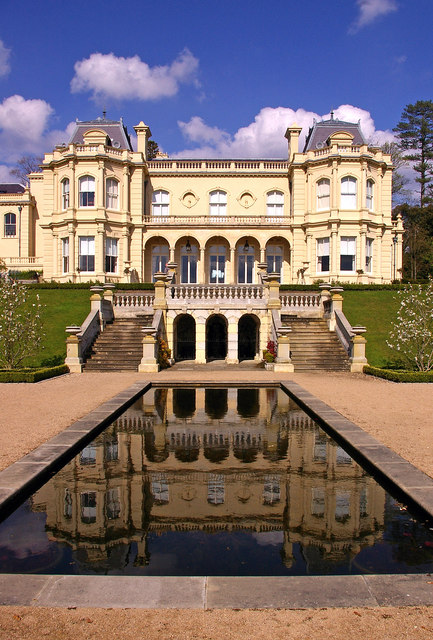
Cherkley Court

In 1910, Aitken moved to Britain, and he became friends with Bonar Law, a native of New Brunswick and the only Canadian to become Prime Minister of the United Kingdom. The two men had a lot in common: they were both sons of the manse from Scottish-Canadian families and both were successful businessmen. Aitken persuaded Bonar Law to support him in standing for the Unionist Party in the December 1910 general election at Ashton-under-Lyne. Aitken was an excellent organiser and, with plenty of money for publicity, he won the seat by 196 votes. Aitken's "bumptious" election campaign brought him some notoriety.

Aitken rarely spoke in the House of Commons, but he did promise substantial financial support to the Unionist Party, and in 1911 he was knighted by King George V. Aitken's political influence grew when Bonar Law replaced A.J. Balfour as leader of the Unionist party late in 1911. Aitken's demands for a protectionist bloc uniting the British empire made him into a disruptive force in the Conservative and Unionist ranks as the idea of a bloc would mean higher food prices, making the plan unpopular with many segments of the British people who disliked the "food taxes" and "stomach taxes". The great dividing line in British politics were between the Whole Hoggers who were willing to accept higher food prices as the consequences of a protectionist bloc vs. the Free Fooders who were not. Aitken had a financial interest in supporting the Whole Hoggers as in 1912 he purchased all of the grain terminals in Alberta in the expectation that an Imperial Preference tariffs would soon be enacted as law. Aitken had little to do as an MP, and set about seeking the acceptance of British elites. The British historian Neal Ascherson wrote: "The first is that posh English society was no match for him. He was 'vulgar', but there was a charm in his self-promotion which made languid ladies and gentlemen want to be on his side and at his side. He was wildly rich even then, but knew how to use his wealth in hospitality and (discreetly) by rescuing grand friends from awkward debts. Above all, he was fun to be with."

In 1911, Aitken was strongly opposed to the reciprocity agreement with the United States signed by the Liberal prime minister of Canada, Sir Wilfrid Laurier, which he believed would lead to the American annexation of Canada. As such, Aitken temporarily returned to Canada to vigorously campaign for the Conservatives led by Sir Robert Borden. Aitken had his friend Rudyard Kipling intervene in the election on behalf of the Conservatives. At the time the line between British and English-Canadian national identities was more blurred than today, and Aitken did not regard Kipling as a "foreign" figure. On 7 September 1911, the Montreal Daily Star (the most widely read newspaper in Canada at the time) published a front-page appeal to all Canadians by Kipling, where he wrote: "It is her own soul that Canada risks today. Once that soul is pawned for any consideration, Canada must inevitably conform to the commercial, legal, financial, social and ethical standards which will be imposed on her by the sheer admitted weight of the United States." Kipling's article attracted much attention in Canada and was reprinted in every English-language Canadian newspaper over the following week, where it was credited with helping the Conservatives win the election.

Aitken bought Cherkley Court south of Leatherhead in Surrey and entertained lavishly there. In 1913, the house was offered as a venue for negotiations between Bonar Law and the Prime Minister, H.H. Asquith, over Ulster and Irish home rule. Later in life, Aitken wrote about his early political efforts:

Empire Fiscal Union was, in fact, my only reason for entering politics in Britain and for continuing to take an interest in public life. My devotion to Bonar Law, my belief in his Leadership, my faith in his ability to give to the Empire some day, perhaps some day soon, the Union I so ardently desired, had kept me in close and intimate touch with him and his political problems.

Aitken continued to grow his business interests while in Parliament, and also began to build a British newspaper empire. After the death of Charles Rolls in 1910, Aitken bought his shares in Rolls-Royce Limited, and over the next two years gradually increased his holding in the company. However, Claude Johnson, Rolls-Royce's Commercial managing director, resisted his attempt to gain control of the company, and in October 1913 Aitken sold his holding to James Buchanan Duke of the American Tobacco Company. In January 1911 Aitken secretly invested £25,000 in the failing Daily Express. An attempt to buy the Evening Standard failed, but he did gain control of another London evening paper, The Globe. In November 1916, a share deal worth £17,500, with Lawson Johnson, landed Aitken a controlling interest in the Daily Express, but again he kept the deal secret.

== First World War ==
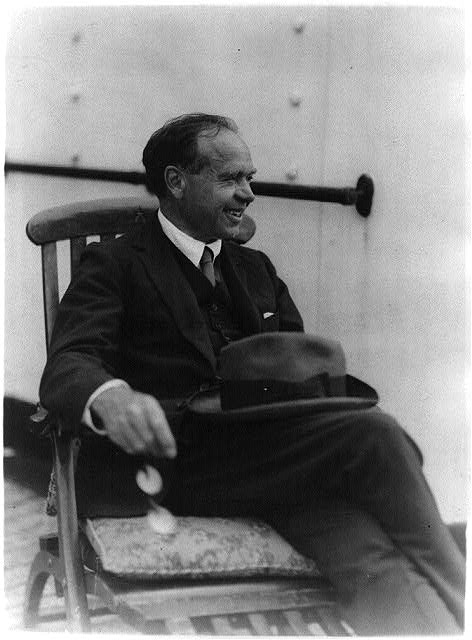
Lord Beaverbrook

Due to the outbreak of the First World War, Aitken was able to show off his great organisational skills. He was innovative in the employment of artists, photographers and film-makers to record life on the Western Front. Aitken also established the Canadian War Memorials Fund, which evolved into a collection of art works by the premier artists and sculptors in Britain and Canada. In accordance with establishing these works, he was also instrumental in creating the Canadian War Records Office in London and arranged for stories about Canadian forces appearing in newspapers. His visits to the Western Front, with the honorary rank of colonel in the Canadian Army, resulted in his 1916 book Canada in Flanders, a three-volume collection that chronicled the achievements of Canadian soldiers on the battlefields. Aitken also wrote several books after the war, including Politicians and the Press in 1925 and Politicians and the War in 1928. At a time when censorship was extremely strict with British journalists being kept away from the Western Front, Aitken's 'Eyewitness' reports from the Western Front, which were published in the Canadian newspapers, made him famous.

Aitken became increasingly hostile towards the British Prime Minister, H. H. Asquith, whom he considered to be mismanaging the war effort. Aitken's opinion of Asquith did not improve when he failed to get a post in the Cabinet reshuffle of May 1915. An attempt by Bonar Law to secure the Order of St Michael and St George for Aitken was also blocked by Asquith. After the failure of the Dardanelles campaign, Winston Churchill was sacked as the First Lord of the Admiralty, and Aitken went to see him to offer him his sympathy. Aitken wrote about Churchill: "The charm, the imaginative sympathy of his hours of defeat, the self-confidence, the arrogance of his hours of power and prosperity". Later, when Churchill went to the Western Front, Aitken allowed him to stay as his guest at his house in Saint-Omer. Ascherson wrote: "A momentous friendship began. In return for contacts and inside information, Aitken would give Churchill hope and energy, and Churchill – in spite of some volcanic quarrels over the next half-century – came to rely on him not only as a political and journalistic ally but as an unfailing source of optimism, gossip, reassurance and sheer fun."

Aitken was happy to play a small part, which he greatly exaggerated, as a go-between when Asquith was forced from office and replaced by David Lloyd George in December 1916. The man Aitken wanted to see replace Asquith was Bonar Law, not Lloyd George. Lloyd George offered to appoint Aitken as President of the Board of Trade. At that time, an MP taking a cabinet post for the first time had to resign and stand for re-election in a by-election. Aitken made arrangements for this, but then Lloyd George decided to appoint Albert Stanley instead. Aitken was a friend of Stanley and agreed to continue with the resignation, so that Stanley could take Aitken's seat in Parliament and be eligible for ministerial office. In return, Aitken received a peerage on 23 January 1917 as the 1st Baron Beaverbrook, the name "Beaverbrook" being adopted from a small community near his boyhood home. He had initially considered "Lord Miramichi", but rejected it on the advice of Louise Manny as too difficult to pronounce. The name "Beaverbrook" also had the advantage of conveying a distinctive Canadian ring to the title.

Beaverbrook's controlling stake in the Daily Express became public knowledge later in 1917, and he was criticised by parts of the Conservative Party for financing a publication they regarded as irresponsible and often unhelpful to the party.

On 10 February 1918, Beaverbrook became the first minister in the newly formed Ministry of Information, was also made Chancellor of the Duchy of Lancaster and was sworn of the Privy Council. Beaverbrook became responsible for propaganda in Allied and neutral countries and Lord Northcliffe (owner of the Daily Mail and The Times) became Director of Propaganda with control of propaganda in enemy countries. Beaverbrook established the British War Memorials Committee within the Ministry, on lines similar to the earlier Canadian war art scheme, but when he established a private charity that would receive income from BWMC exhibitions, it was regarded as a conflict of interest and he dropped the scheme. Beaverbrook had a number of clashes with the Foreign Secretary Arthur Balfour over the use of intelligence material. He felt that intelligence should become part of his department, but Balfour disagreed. Eventually, the intelligence committee was assigned to Beaverbrook, but they then resigned en masse to be re-employed by the Foreign Office. In August 1918, Lloyd George became furious with Beaverbrook over a leader in the Daily Express threatening to withdraw support from the government over tariff reform. Beaverbrook increasingly came under attack from MPs who distrusted a press baron being employed by the state. He survived but became increasingly frustrated with his limited role and influence, and in October 1918, he resigned due to ill health. A tooth had become infected with actinomycosis and the often fatal disease progressed into his throat; his English doctors were unable to provide a cure, and it was a Portuguese medic who cured him by administering iodine solution orally until the infection was arrested.

A. J. P. Taylor later wrote that Beaverbrook was a pathbreaker who "invented all the methods of publicity" used by Britain to promote the war, including the nation's first war artists, the first war photographers, and the first makers of war films. He was especially effective in promoting the sales of war bonds to the general public. Nevertheless, he was widely disliked and distrusted by the political elite, who were suspicious of all they sneeringly called "press lords".

== Press baron ==
Lord Beaverbrook, c. August 1941

After the war, Beaverbrook concentrated on running the Daily Express. He turned the dull newspaper into a glittering and witty journal with an optimistic attitude, filled with an array of dramatic photo layouts. He hired first-rate writers such as Francis Williams and the cartoonist David Low. He embraced new technology and bought new presses to print the paper in Manchester. In 1919, the circulation of the Daily Express was under 40,000 a day; by 1937, it was 2,329,000 a day, making it the most successful of all British newspapers and generating huge profits for Beaverbrook, whose wealth was already such that he never took a salary. After the Second World War, the Daily Express became the largest-selling newspaper in the world, with a circulation of 3,706,000. Beaverbrook launched the Sunday Express in December 1918, but it only established a significant readership after John Junor became its editor in 1954. In 1923, in a joint deal with Lord Rothermere, Beaverbrook bought the Evening Standard. Beaverbrook acquired a controlling stake in the Glasgow Evening Citizen, and in 1928 he launched the Scottish Daily Express.

After the death of Lord Northcliffe in 1922, Beaverbrook, with Lords Rothermere, Camrose and Kemsley became one of the four so-called press barons that were the dominant figures in the inter-war press. By 1937, the four owned nearly one in every two national and local daily papers sold in Britain, as well as one in every three Sunday papers that were sold. The combined circulation of all their newspapers amounted to over thirteen million.

Beaverbrook purchased The Vineyard, Fulham, a "tiny Tudor house in Hurlingham Road" where ... "far from the centre of London I was relieved of casual callers and comparatively free of long-winded visitors. I provided facilities by means of private telephone lines without any direct contact with the Telephone Exchanges. Thus the political conferences held there were safeguarded against interruption." Powerful friends and acquaintances such as Asquith, Lloyd George, Churchill, Frederick Edwin Smith, Philip Sassoon, Diana and Duff Cooper, Balfour and Tim Healy were guests at both Cherkley and the Vineyard. The circle included Valentine Castlerosse, H. G. Wells and Rudyard Kipling, who was godfather to Beaverbrook's youngest son Peter, but this did nothing to repair the rift that developed between them when Beaverbrook endorsed Irish Home Rule.

Beaverbrook, the first baron of Fleet Street, was often denounced as excessively powerful because his newspapers supposedly could make or break almost anyone. Beaverbrook enjoyed using his papers to attack his opponents and to promote his friends. From 1919 to 1922, he attacked David Lloyd George and his government on several issues. A colourful character, the American historian Randall Woods described him as "...a sharp, intense, unpredictable man. He was something of a firebrand, tending to overstatement and even irresponsibility in his editorials or public statements...Conspiracy was second nature to him...In conversation, Beaverbrook was constantly exaggerating and embellishing." Beaverbrook was considered to be likeable character full of charm and zest, but he was widely distrusted by the British elite as he was viewed as an unprincipled intriguer. A flamboyant, charismatic man full of dynamism and exuberance who stood out on account of his Canadian Maritime accent, Beaverbrook was the subject of much fascination by the public. He was disliked by his employees as a demanding boss who had telephones installed in every room of his house so that he could always call his newspapers editors to give his orders about what story was interesting him at the moment without having to wait. Beaverbrook's much vaunted principle of "independence" under which he felt free to attack his allies via his newspapers made him few friends.

Though a Conservative, Beaverbrook was opposed to British intervention in the Russian civil war and used his newspapers to argue that the question of who ruled Russia was no business of Britain's. Beaverbrook had one of his periodic falling outs with Churchill at the time, and saw attacking intervention in the Russian civil war, which Churchill had strongly promoted, as a way of lashing out. For example, on 6 September 1919, Beaverbrook ran on the front page of The Daily Express a banner headline, "ARCHANGEL SCANDAL EXPOSED: FAMOUS VC APPEALS TO THE NATION" above an article attacking the intervention as pointless and singled Churchill as the author of an expedition that had gone horribly wrong. The subtitle of the article was "DUPLICITY OF CHRUCHILL'S POLICY TOWARDS RUSSIA-THE PUBLIC HUMBUGGED". A linked article claimed that the British force in Arkhangelsk were poised to go deep into Russia with the aim of overthrowing the Bolshevik regime, and Churchill had lied to the British people about the purpose of the expedition. In 1920, Beaverbrook opposed British aid to Poland on the grounds that the Soviet-Polish war did not involve British interests.

Beaverbrook opposed Zionism and visited Palestine in 1923. There, he hired anti-Zionist writer Jacob Israël de Haan to be the Daily Express correspondent. De Haan wrote anonymously for his own safety, but was nevertheless identified and murdered by the Zionist Haganah the following year.

Beaverbrook began supporting independent Conservative candidates and campaigned for fifteen years to remove Stanley Baldwin from the leadership of the Conservative Party. In the 1924 election, he used the Daily Express to associate the Labour Party with the Soviet Union, writing in a leader: "We are not fighting Mr. Ramsay MacDonald in his saner moments, but the Russian Bolshevists and the shade of Lenin." The Daily Express did not first publish the so-called Zinoviev letter, a probably forged letter in which Grigory Zinoviev, the chief of the Comintern, was alleged to order British Communists to infiltrate the Labour Party and the military, which was published in the Daily Mail instead. However, after the Zinoviev letter was published, Beaverbrook had the Daily Express in its coverage of 1924 election associate the Labour Party with Communism. The cartoons which the Daily Express published tended to depict Communists as alien, dirty, hairy, and unkempt, thereby associating them with popular stereotypes of the poor.

In foreign policy, Beaverbrook promoted a policy known as "empire isolationism", namely that Britain should devote its interests to the British empire, but be otherwise disengaged from the rest of the world. A recurring theme of Beaverbrook's newspapers was that Britain was not a European nation, and should have as little to do as possible with the affairs of Europe. Likewise, Beaverbrook was opposed to British membership in the League of Nations and in a 1923 leader advocated giving up the Palestine Mandate (modern Israel), which Britain held as the administering power for the League, under the grounds that Palestine was more of a debit than a credit for the British empire. A typical statement from Beaverbrook was: "The British empire exists for the British race. It is our heritage. Let us cultivate it, defend it, cherish it, and make it great, rich and strong in righteousness, an example and object lesson for the rest of mankind". In 1925, Beaverbrook wrote: "In the Empire and not in Europe our future lies and the Daily Express has never failed to preach the Imperial doctrine in good or bad times. The Daily Express believes that the British Empire is the greatest instrument for good the world has ever seen". Beaverbrook believed that protecting the greatness as he saw it of the empire could be best accomplished via "splendid isolation" as he consistently argued for an isolationist foreign policy. In 1925, Beaverbrook via the Daily Express was strongly opposed to the Treaty of Locarno under which Britain "guaranteed" the current borders of France, Belgium, and Germany along with the permanent demilitarized status of the Rhineland as involvement in European conflicts where no British interests were at stake.

Reflecting his origins, Beaverbrook always thought in terms of the British empire rather than of Britain, and he had an essentially Commonwealth perspective as he argued that the Dominions were just as important as Britain in holding the empire together. Beaverbrook believed that because Britain had more people than what British agriculture was capable of feeding while the Dominions produced more food than what their people needed that a symbiotic relationship would be possible with British industry supplying the manufactured goods for the Dominions while the Dominions would supply food and other raw materials to Britain. As such, Beaverbrook wanted to see the end of all trade barriers within the Commonwealth and a system of tariffs to keep non-Commonwealth products out of the Commonwealth to form what he called the Empire Free Trade zone. Taylor credited Beaverbrook's Canadian origins for his beliefs about an "Empire Free Trade zone" as he wrote: "At the bottom this was pure sentiment, a desire to be both British as well as Canadian, and a desire, also characteristic of a Canadian, that the British empire should maintain its independence from the United States".

Beaverbrook had long resented Baldwin's leadership of the Conservative Party and the loss of his influence that had followed the resignation of Bonar Law in 1923. Beaverbrook had privately "rejoiced" when the Conservatives lost the 1929 election, seeing Labour's victory as a chance to impose his views on the Conservative party, especially with regard to the Empire Free Trade zone. Through there was much discontent within the Conservative ranks over Baldwin's leadership, Beaverbrook was regarded as an "untouchable" by the Conservative elite. In July 1929, Beaverbrook launched the Empire Crusade movement to campaign for the "Empire Free Trade zone", which attracted support from various Tory backbencher MPs, peers and local riding associations.

He very shrewdly sold the majority of his share holdings before the 1929 crash and in the resulting depression, launched a new political party to promote free trade within the British Empire. Empire Free Trade Crusade candidates had some success. An Independent Conservative who supported Empire Free Trade won the Twickenham by-election in 1929. In December 1929, Beaverbrook set up a central office to coordinate the Empire Crusade movement. However, Beaverbrook could not quite decide if the purpose of the Empire Crusade was to depose Baldwin or just merely have the Conservative party give him the respect he felt he deserved. In February 1930, the Empire Crusade movement was joined by Lord Rothermere, the proprietor of the Daily Mail. Beaverbrook and Rothermere founded that month the United Empire Party. The United Empire Party was intended to split the right-wing vote to such an extent that it would be impossible for the Conservatives to ever win a general vote again, and in this way Rothermre and Beaverbrook intended to impose their will on the Conservative party. However, Beaverbrook and Rothermere differed in their intentions. Rothermere made it very clear that he wanted to see Baldwin replaced with a puppet leader of his choosing. Likewise, Rothermere had doubts about the "food taxes" as the proposed tariffs on food were known and promoted a "no-surrender line" with regard to the Government of India Act. The Empire Free Trade candidate won the South Paddington by-election in October 1930. In February 1931, Empire Free Trade lost the Islington East by-election and, by splitting the vote with the Conservatives, allowed Labour to hold a seat they had been expected to lose. Duff Cooper's victory for the Conservatives in the St George's Westminster by-election in March 1931 marked the end of the movement as an electoral force.

On 17 March 1931, during the St George's Westminster by-election, Stanley Baldwin described the media barons who owned British newspapers as having "Power without responsibility – the prerogative of the harlot throughout the ages."

== "Empire Isolationism" and appeasement ==
In March 1933, he visited Germany, where he wrote that it was his impression that "the stories of Jewish persecution are exaggerated". His most enduring impressions of his German trip was he felt that SA could not march properly, and he seemed to regard the Nazis as something of a joke who were not capable of achieving much of anything. Beaverbrook frequently changed his views about Adolf Hitler, which caused the obituary writers who worked for him much anguish as they were forced to change their drafts of a Hitler obituary from positive to negative to positive again. After the Night of the Long Knives, Beaverbrook "turned solidly, fanatically anti-Hitler" as he compared Hitler to Al Capone and the Nazis to gangsters. Beaverbrook was to change his opinions about Hitler a number of times afterwards.

In a guest opinion column published in April 1935 in the Hearst newspapers, Beaverbrook set out to explain "the section of opinion to which I belong - the Isolationists". Beaverbrook advocated that: "Britain should make no alliances except with the United States, that we should incur no obligations, no responsibilities, no liabilities outside of the Empire except in relation to the Anglo-Saxon race". He supported the "limited liability" rearmament under which the Royal Air Force and the Royal Navy were built up at the expense of the British Army as the rearmament programme in best accord with his own foreign policy ideas. In 1935, Beaverbrook campaigned against the Peace Ballot, an unofficial referendum organised in 1935 by the League of Nations Union, as the "Ballot of Blood". He was concerned that if Britain should be obliged to enforce the collective security policies of the League of Nations against aggression, it could involve Britain in wars where no British interests were at stake. In a leader in the Daily Express, he wrote the collective security policy of the League "will drag you and your children into a war" caused by "the ambitious and unscrupulous powers" that were the other members of the League (Beaverbrook failed to mention that to activate collective security required the approval of the League Council, of which Britain was a veto-holding member). Beaverbrook stated that his readers should not take part in the Peace Ballot and wrote: "Tear up the ballot paper. Throw the pieces in the waste paper basket. Turn away from Europe. Stand by the Empire and Splendid Isolation".

During the crisis caused by the Italian aggression against Ethiopia, Beaverbrook was opposed to the policy of imposing sanctions on Italy under the banner of the League of Nations, as he argued that the Italo-Ethiopian war did not concern Britain. In a leader, he warned that the sanctions on Italy might cause a "world race war", as he stated that Ethiopia was not worth fighting for, as it was an African nation. Likewise, when Germany remilitarised the Rhineland on 7 March 1936, violating both the Treaty of Versailles and the Treaty of Locarno, Beaverbrook used his newspapers to argue against Britain taking action to enforce the treaties it had signed. Beaverbrook maintained good relations with Ivan Maisky, the Soviet ambassador in London, writing to him in 1936 about his "...friendly attitude towards your Great Leader" and he was "determined that nothing shall be said or done by any newspaper controlled by me which is likely to disturb your tenure in office". Beaverbrook concluded "while I am free, and my newspapers in the attitude I take to the Russian leader, I must say I admire and praise his conduct of government". In 1936, at the invitation of Joachim von Ribbentrop, the new German ambassador to the Court of St. James, Beaverbrook attended the opening of the 1936 Berlin Olympics, but quickly became bored with the Third Reich and soon returned to Britain."

In the 1930s, while personally attempting to dissuade King Edward VIII from continuing his affair with American divorcee, Wallis Simpson, Beaverbrook's newspapers published every titbit of the affair, especially allegations about pro-Nazi sympathies. Reflecting his "empire isolationism", Beaverbrook used the Daily Express to promote British neutrality as he wrote a leader which compared supporting the Second Spanish Republic as alike to supporting the Whites in the Russian Civil War, as he declared that British intervention in the Russian civil war "cost us some thousands of British soldiers' lives, £100,000,000 in cash, and the bitter enmity of the Russian government for the next ten years...and the intervention failed anyway. Britain had backed a loser. It is the mark of a mug to go on backing the same loser". In 1936, the Daily Express published an opinion piece by Lloyd George who had just returned from meeting Hitler at the Nuremberg Party Rally in which he called der Führer "the George Washington of Germany". Beaverbrook published the piece, but told Lloyd George that he was embarrassed by it as he disliked "the regimentation of opinion" in Germany. In regards to the Sino-Japanese war, Beaverbrook was entirely concerned about a possible Japanese threat to the British empire and used the Daily Express to sound his fears that the Japanese might try to seize the British colonies in Asia. In a 1938 leader, Beaverbrook warned: "Too many people would be interested in checking Japan if that country really MEANT trouble against white people...The British public seem to have sensed what the British ministers have not - that Japan is dynamiting her way not only through the Chinese empire, but dangerously near other empires. Get out your map!" Along the leader was a map that showed the proximity of Japanese troops to Hong Kong. Beaverbrook supported the Munich Agreement and hoped the newly named Duke of Windsor would seek a peace deal with Germany.

Testifying before a Parliamentary inquiry in 1947, former Express employee and future MP Michael Foot alleged that Beaverbrook kept a blacklist of notable public figures who were to be denied any publicity in his papers because of personal disputes. Foot said they included Sir Thomas Beecham, Paul Robeson, Haile Selassie and Noël Coward. Beaverbrook himself gave evidence before the inquiry and vehemently denied the allegations; Express Newspapers general manager E. J. Robertson denied that Robeson had been blacklisted, but did admit that Coward had been "boycotted" because he had enraged Beaverbrook with his film In Which We Serve, for in the opening sequence Coward included an ironic shot showing a copy of the Daily Express floating in the dockside rubbish bearing the headline "No War This Year".

In the late 1930s, Beaverbrook used his newspapers to promote the appeasement policies of the Chamberlain government. The slogan 'There will be no war' was used by the Daily Express. At the time of the Sudetenland crisis, Beaverbrook wrote in a leader: "... do not get caught up in quarrels over foreign boundaries that do not concern you." Beaverbrook was strongly opposed to the famous "guarantee" offered by Chamberlain for Poland in the House of Commons on 31 March 1939 under his usual grounds that Britain had no interests in Poland, and no reason to go to war for Poland. Beaverbrook told Maisky: "I want the empire to remain intact, but I don't understand why for the sake of this we must wage a three-year war to crush "Hitlerism"...Poland, Czechoslovakia? What are they to do with us? Cursed be the day when Chamberlain gave our guarantees to Poland!" On 4 August 1939, a leader in the Daily Express questioned the need for British commitments to Poland as it was declared: "while there are some reasons in favour of an alliance with France...our alliances in Eastern Europe are another matter". On 7 August 1939, the Daily Express ran a banner headline saying "No War This Year" as it predicated the Danzig crisis would be settled peacefully. In a memo dated 3 March 1943, Beaverbrook was unapologetic about the "no war" headlines as he wrote: "The prophecy proved wrong. The policy, had it been pursued more vigorously might have proved it right". The British historian Daniel Hucker wrote that Beaverbrook was out of touch with the readers of his newspapers in the summer of 1939.

== Second World War ==
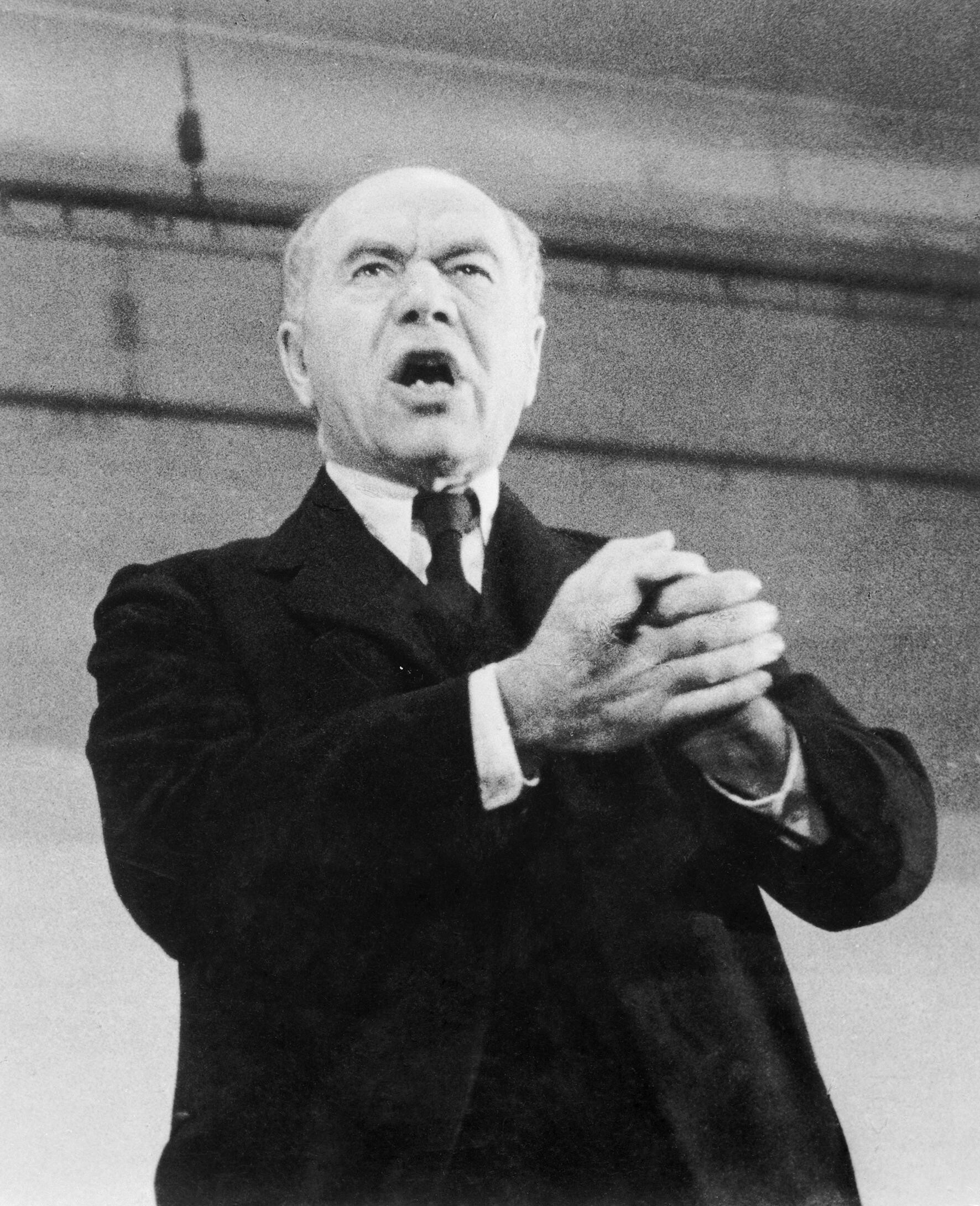
Lord Beaverbrook during the Second World War

Though Beaverbrook did not welcome the British declaration of war on the Reich on 3 September 1939, he had his newspapers take an ultra-patriotic line in supporting the war effort, not least because he knew the vast majority of his readers supported the war. During the Second World War, in May 1940, his friend Winston Churchill, the British Prime Minister, appointed Beaverbrook as Minister of Aircraft Production. Beaverbrook was given almost dictatorial powers over all aspects of aircraft production. In June 1940, Beaverbrook went with Churchill in a desperate mission to Tours to meet the French government with the aim of keeping France in the war. The French Premier, Paul Reynaud, was against an armistice with Germany and in favor of continuing the war from Algeria, but the strongest voice in the French cabinet was that of Marshal Philippe Pétain, the revered "Victor of Verdun", who argued for an immediate armistice. Churchill devised a scheme for an Anglo-French Union as a way to keep France in the war, to which Beaverbrook was strongly opposed. Unlike Churchill, Beaverbrook did not see any particular importance of keeping France in the war, and was much more indifferent to the prospect of France being defeated than was the prime minister, arguing that Britain still had the Commonwealth and the empire. Churchill's viewpoint that if France were occupied, it would shorten the flying time of the Luftwaffe to bomb Britain from hours to minutes and allow the Kriegsmarine to use the French Atlantic ports to attack shipping in the Western Approaches made no impression on Beaverbrook. The plans for an Anglo-French union fell flat when Pétain - who regarded the plan for a union as a way for the British to seize France's colonial empire - persuaded the French cabinet to reject it.

With Churchill's blessing, Beaverbrook overhauled all aspects of wartime aircraft production. He increased production targets by 15% across the board, took control of aircraft repairs and RAF storage units, replaced the management of plants that were underperforming, and released German Jewish engineers from internment to work in the factories. He seized materials and equipment destined for other departments and was perpetually at odds with the Air Ministry. Beaverbrook did not tolerate the arguments that supply "bottlenecks" were hindering aircraft production and required that aircraft manufacturers submit to him a daily list of "bottlenecks" which he made his mission to resolve. One of Beaverbrook's first acts as minister of aircraft production was to order the "cannibalization" of all wrecked aircraft, which totalled about 2,000 aeroplanes. For every two wrecked planes, it was possible to fashion a new plane. His appeal for pots and pans "to make Spitfires" was afterwards revealed by his son, Sir Max Aitken, to have been nothing more than a propaganda exercise. Still, a Time Magazine cover story declared, "Even if Britain goes down this fall, it will not be Lord Beaverbrook's fault. If she holds out, it will be his triumph. This war is a war of machines. It will be won on the assembly line."

Under Beaverbrook, fighter and bomber production increased so much so that Churchill declared: "His personal force and genius made this Aitken's finest hour." Beaverbrook's impact on wartime production has been much debated but he certainly energized production at a time when it was desperately needed. The biography by Anthony Furze of Wilfrid Freeman, a senior official in the Ministry of Aircraft Production, discusses the Beaverbrook myth 'Magic is nine tenth's illusion' describing how Freeman had to limit the worst side-effects of Beaverbrook's short-term thinking (Spellmount Press, 2000). The Royal Marine General Leslie Hollis who worked as the Senior Assistant Secretary to the War Cabinet recalled in an interview: "For all Beaverbrook's tremendous achievement in producing aeroplanes, there was little to praise in the way he rode roughshod over everyone. He never carried an oil can. He did as he liked, when he liked. He once promoted an Air Commodore to Air Vice-Marshal-over the heads of fifty more senior Air Commodores. This sort of behavior did not make for happiness, but it was the way he worked, and the end justified the means". Hollis stated that for Beaverbrook all that mattered was if someone was efficient or not, and he was very ruthless about sacking those he viewed as inefficient. However, it has been argued that aircraft production was already rising when Beaverbrook took charge and that he was fortunate to inherit a system which was just beginning to bear fruit. Air Chief Marshal Lord Dowding, Head of Fighter Command during the Battle of Britain wrote that "We had the organization, we had the men, we had the spirit which could bring us victory in the air but we had not the supply of machines necessary to withstand the drain of continuous battle. Lord Beaverbrook gave us those machines, and I do not believe that I exaggerate when I say that no other man in England could have done so." Hollis recalled in an interview: "Beaverbrook's ruthless, cut-throat, steam-roller approach to every problem made him feared as well as respected. You either got on with him or you did not; and in the latter case, it was better and safer to give him a wide berth. Nevertheless, he was a staunch and faithful friend to me, and immensely kind." Beaverbrook increasingly came into conflict with Ernest Bevin over a number of issues such as whose ministry would be responsible for safety training in aircraft factories, and the two ministers spent much time feuding. Hollis recalled: "Their hostility grew to such an extent that it embarrassed Mr. Churchill, and caused a great deal of unhappiness in the government. It seemed astonishing that, at such a time, two men of such stature and ability should be so eager to score points off each other. I was especially grieved at this because I admired both men very much". Hollis also recalled that Beaverbrook's relations with Churchill would vary dramatically as he stated: "Beaverbrook's friendship with Churchill was of very long standing and to my mind, quite stormy. They would fight and argue every Monday and Tuesday; part on Wednesday and Thursday; and then make it up again on Friday and Saturday".

Beaverbrook resigned on 30 April 1941 and, after a month as Minister of State, Churchill appointed him to the post of Minister of Supply. Here Beaverbrook clashed with Ernest Bevin who, as Minister of Labour and National Service, refused to let Beaverbrook take over any of his responsibilities. On 10 May 1941, Rudolf Hess made his flight to Scotland to contact the Duke of Hamilton about opening talks for an Anglo-German peace. Instead, he was taken into custody by local police constables. Beaverbrook was sent to interview Hess with orders to find out just what had motivated the deputy Führer to fly to Scotland. Hess spoke fluent English and it was in that language that the interview was conducted. Beaverbrook reported to Churchill that Hess was an exceedingly eccentric and strange man who believed that the war between Germany and Britain was a grave mistake. Beaverbrook further stated that the best he could discern for Hess's motives was that he had told him that Germany was going to be invading the Soviet Union in the very near-future and now was the ideal time for the two "Nordic" nations to stop their pointless "fratricidal" war and join forces against the Soviet Union, whom Hess insisted was the common enemy of both nations.

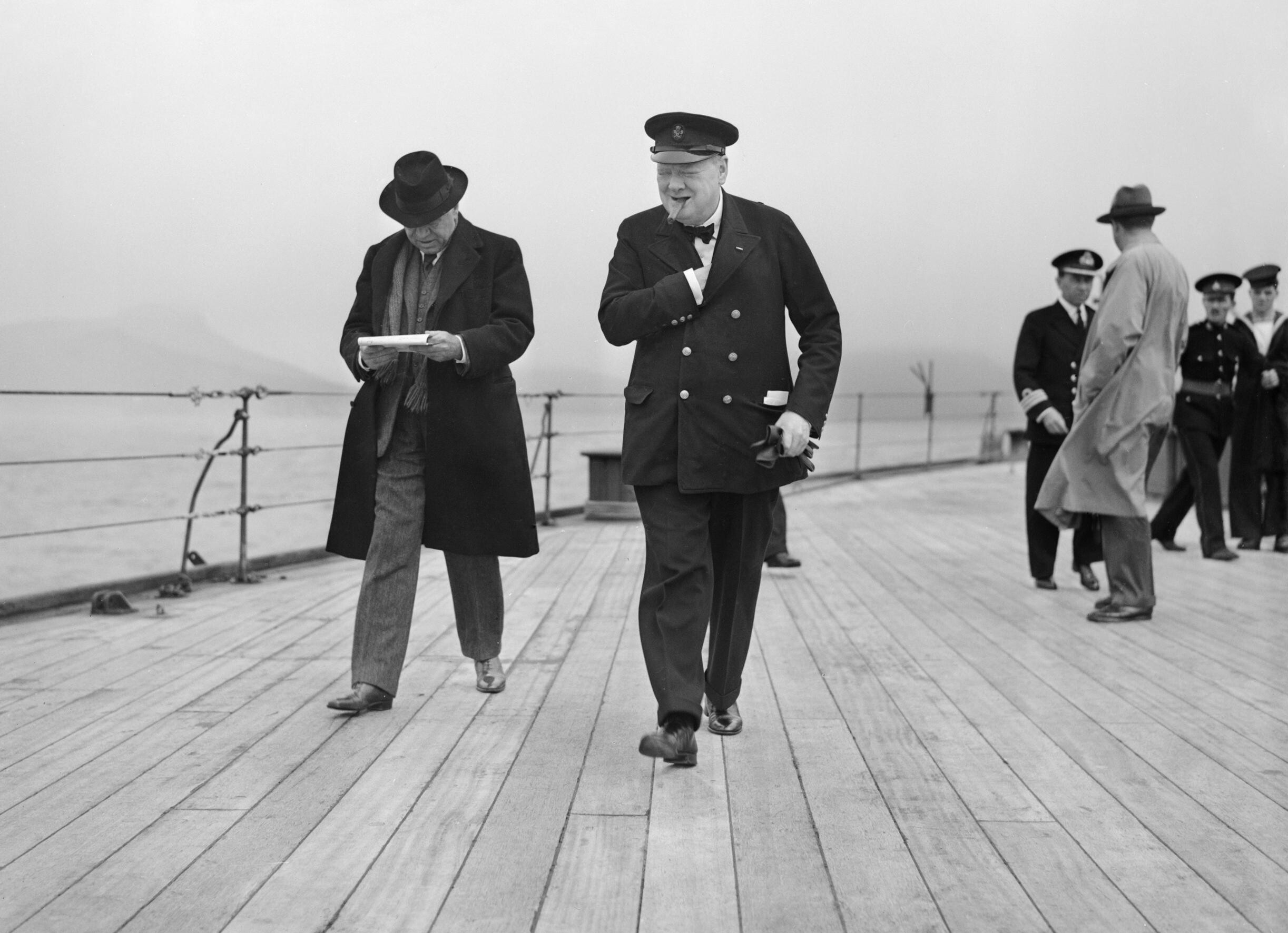
Winston Churchill and Lord Beaverbrook on HMS PRINCE OF WALES during the Atlantic Conference with President Roosevelt, August 1941

Early on the morning of 22 June 1941, Hess's predications about the coming invasion of the Soviet Union came true when Operation Barbarossa, the largest invasion in history, was launched with 3 million German soldiers organised into three army groups invaded the Soviet Union. In September 1941, Beaverbrook headed the British delegation to Moscow with his American counterpart Averell Harriman (Moscow Conference (1941)). This made Beaverbrook the first senior British politician to meet Soviet leader Joseph Stalin since Adolf Hitler's invasion of the Soviet Union. Harriman said of Beaverbrook's role in the mission: 'has been a great salesman...His genius never worked more effectively.' Beaverbrook met Stalin at the Kremlin and developed a liking for the Soviet leader, finding him to be a man like himself who regarded committees as time-wasting and preferred action over meetings.

Beaverbrook was one of the few close associates to Churchill to be present at his meetings with President Roosevelt on board HMS Prince of Wales and USS Augusta in the North Atlantic off the coast of Newfoundland over the period from 9 to 12 August 1941. Much impressed by Stalin and the sacrifice of the Soviet people, he returned to London determined to persuade Churchill to launch a second front in Europe to help draw German resources away from the Eastern Front to aid the Soviets. In a memo to Churchill on 19 October 1941, Beaverbrook wrote the involvement of the Soviet Union in the war offered a chance to win decisively far sooner than expected. In February 1942, Beaverbrook became Minister of War Production and again clashed with Bevin, this time over shipbuilding. In the face of Bevin's refusal to work with him, Beaverbrook resigned after only twelve days in the post. In September 1943, he was appointed Lord Privy Seal, outside of the Cabinet, and held that post until the end of the war. After leaving the War Cabinet, Beaverbrook made himself the main spokesman for the "Second Front Now" campaign, calling for an Anglo-American invasion of France. This put him at odds with Churchill, who favoured the "peripheral strategy" of winning the war via strategical bombing of Germany, maintaining command of the sea, and the "Mediterranean strategy" of engaging the Wehrmacht in North Africa and Italy. Despite their disagreement over the second front, Beaverbrook remained a close confidant of Churchill throughout the war, and could regularly be found with Churchill until the early hours of the morning. Clement Attlee commented that "Churchill often listened to Beaverbrook's advice but was too sensible to take it."

In addition to his ministerial roles, Beaverbrook headed the Anglo-American Combined Raw Materials Board from 1942 to 1945 and accompanied Churchill to several wartime meetings with President Roosevelt. He was able to relate to Roosevelt in a different way than Churchill and became close to Roosevelt during these visits. This friendship sometimes irritated Churchill who felt that Beaverbrook was distracting Roosevelt from concentrating on the war effort. For his part, Roosevelt seems to have enjoyed the distraction.

== Later life ==
Beaverbrook devoted himself to Churchill's 1945 general election campaign, but a Daily Express headline warning that a Labour victory would amount to the 'Gestapo in Britain' (adapted from a passage in a radio election speech by Churchill on 4 June) was a huge mistake and completely misjudged the public mood. Beaverbrook renounced his British citizenship and left the Conservative Party in 1951, but remained an Empire loyalist throughout his life. In 1947, Beaverbrook was vehemently opposed to the plans to end the Raj, with the colony of India to be granted independence and partitioned into the new nations of India and Pakistan. Through the decision to end the Raj was taken by the Labour prime minister, Clement Attlee, Beaverbrook directed his ire against the last Viceroy, Admiral Louis Mountbatten, who Beaverbrook believed could have somehow defied the government and not granted independence if he had wanted to. In a leader, the Daily Express wrote that "in all the world we have few more dangerous enemies" than Mountbatten and Jawaharlal Nehru. Beaverbrook never forgave Mountbatten and for the rest of his life used the Daily Express to blacken his reputation and always presented Mountbatten in the worst possible light.

Beaverbrook took a typically idiosyncratic line with regard to the Cold War, holding out hopes in the editorial line of the Daily Express until 1948 that the wartime "Big Three" alliance of the Soviet Union, the United States and the United Kingdom should continue after the war. It was only after the Berlin blockade began in 1948 that Beaverbrook had the Daily Express take an anti-Soviet line, but even then he continued to hold out hopes that the Cold War would not be permanent and it might be possible to revive the "Big Three" alliance. Beaverbrook had Wilfred Burchett, an Australian journalist of extreme left-wing views based in East Berlin to run a column in The Daily Express entitled "The Russian Window" starting in October 1948. The nature of Burchett's "Russian Window" reports about life behind the Iron Curtain such as his claims that there was a surplus of luxury goods on sale in shops in Moscow led to accusations that he was engaged in propaganda for the Soviet Union, a nation that Burchett clearly admired. When Beaverbrook asked the editor of the Daily Express, Arthur Christiansen about Burchett after reading several of his "Russian Window" columns, he was told: "He is, I think, a fellow traveler, but nevertheless an able chap". Even after the "Russian Window" column was terminated, Burchett continued to work as a free-lancer for The Daily Express based in Budapest, where he denied in one article that Cardinal József Mindszenty had confessed at his show trial under the influence of "truth drugs". In 1950, Christiansen turned down a chance to publish photographs of South Korean policemen engaged in a mass execution of suspected Communists because to do so would have "given our enemies a chance to say we are playing the Communist game and did the Daily Worker propaganda for them". The photographs were later published in The Daily Worker which presented the executions as typical of justice in South Korea, and led to Beaverbrook to complain that it was a shame that The Daily Express did not have those "real fine pictures".

Beaverbrook used his newspapers to campaign against Mountbatten being appointed First Sea Lord on the grounds that he "gave away" India in 1947. When Mountbatten was appointed First Sea Lord, the Beaverbrook newspapers went out of their way to portray the Royal Navy under Mountbatten's leadership in a negative light. As part of his campaign against Mountbatten, Beaverbrook used his newspapers to make allegations to the effect that Mountbatten had deliberately launched the Dieppe raid of 19 August 1942 - in which the 2nd Canadian Infantry Division had taken heavy losses – in the full knowledge that it would fail to prevent a second front from being opened in 1942. Beaverbrook angrily told Mountbatten at a dinner party hosted by Harriman in London: "You murdered my Canadians to wreck my Second Front campaign!" Tom Driberg, the Labour MP who also worked as the gossip columnist for the Daily Express detailed these allegations in a manuscript of a biography of Beaverbrook he wrote in the mid-1950s, but the threats of a libel suit from Mountbatten led the allegations being removed from the published book. The British historian Adrien Smith argued that the real reason for Beaverbrook's feud with Mountbatten was that one of his various mistresses, Jean Norton, had shared her affections with Mountbatten. Beaverbrook was frequently unfaithful towards his wife, but he was possessive of his mistresses.

In 1956, Beaverbrook used the Daily Express to clamour for war against Egypt after President Gamal Abdel Nasser nationalised the partly British-owned Compagnie universelle du canal maritime de Suez, an act that Beaverbrook considered to be intolerable. When the invasion of Egypt began in October 1956, Beaverbrook had the Daily Express support the war as a justified assertion of British national interests. Beaverbrook regarded the end of the Suez crisis, with Britain being forced to withdraw under strong American-Soviet pressure to be a national humiliation, and much of the anti-Americanism he was to express in his last years related to bitterness over the Suez crisis. Beaverbrook likewise favoured a hawkish line on the Cyprus Emergency as he used his newspapers to support keeping Cyprus a British colony and regarded the decision to grant Cyprus independence in 1960 again as a national humiliation.

Aitken continued to live lavishly. Ascherson noted: "His life became a progress like a medieval king's, cruising on Atlantic liners and luxurious yachts with a great retinue of servants, cronies, henchmen, useful politicians and pretty women. But the Beaver did not forget old comrades. The ageing Churchill was free to stay and paint in the sun at La Capponcina whenever he pleased, and their friendship grew closer until Beaverbrook's death in 1964. He used his money and connections quietly to rescue many other lesser figures in trouble. A.J.P. Taylor justly called him "a foul-weather friend".

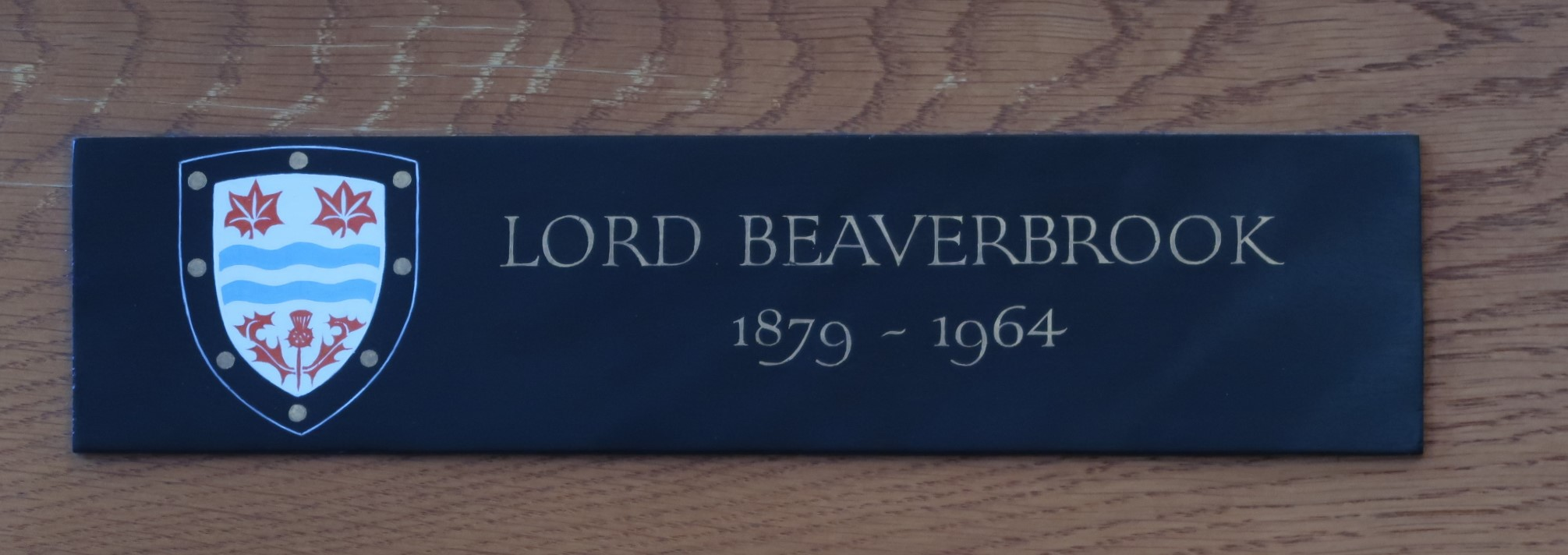
Plaque on pew in St Bride's Church (the Journalists' Church) off Fleet Street, London (2023)

He opposed both Britain's acceptance of post-war loans from America and Britain's application to join the European Economic Community in 1961. In 1953 he became chancellor-for-life of the University of New Brunswick through an Act of the local legislature. In 1960, the Prime Minister Harold Macmillan decided to have the United Kingdom join the European Economic Community (EEC) as the European Union was then called, but he waited until July 1961 to formally make the application at least in part out of the fear over the reaction of the Beaverbrook newspapers. Beaverbrook was strongly opposed to the application and used his newspapers to offer ferocious criticism of Macmillan's application to join the EEC, accusing him of a betrayal of the Commonwealth, whom Beaverbrook continued to insist were Britain's natural allies. In 1960, the Daily Express was selling 4,300,000 copies per day, making it Britain's most popular newspaper.

He became the university's greatest benefactor, fulfilling the same role for the city of Fredericton and the province as a whole. He would provide additional buildings for the university, scholarship funds, the Beaverbrook Art Gallery, the Beaverbrook Skating Rink, the Lord Beaverbrook Hotel, with profits donated to charity, the Playhouse, Louise Manny's early folklore work, and numerous other projects. He bought the archive papers of both Bonar Law and David Lloyd George and placed them in the Beaverbrook Library within the Daily Express Building. Beaverbrook was always proud of his New Brunswick roots, and liked to claim in his last years that four of the most outstanding men of his generation were from New Brunswick, by which he meant Bonar Law, R.B. Bennett, Sir James Hamet Dunn and himself.

== Personal life ==
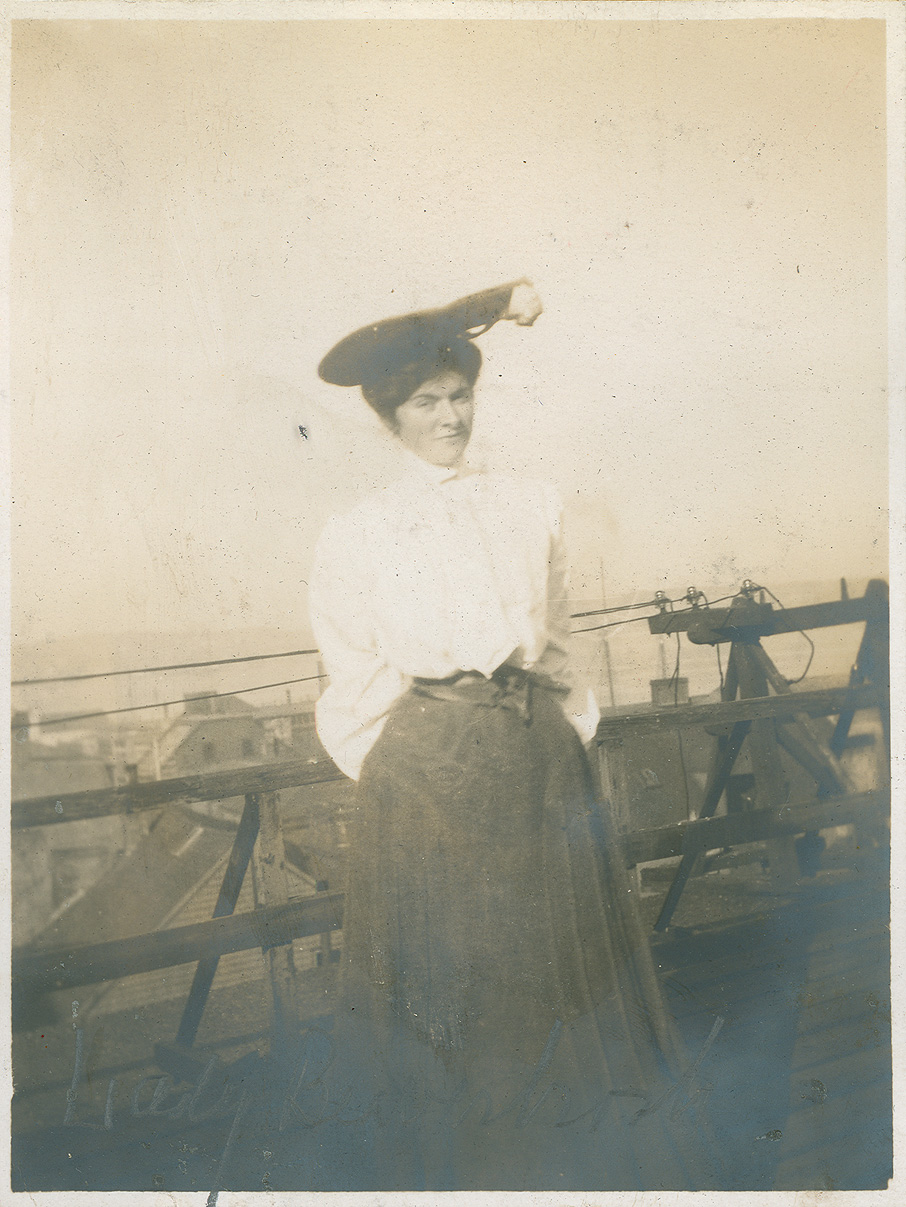
Gladys Drury, sometime before her marriage

On 29 January 1906, in Halifax, Aitken married Gladys Henderson Drury, daughter of Major-General Charles William Drury CB (a first cousin of Admiral Sir Charles Carter Drury) and Mary Louise Drury (née Henderson). They had three children before her death on 1 December 1927.

Their son Max Aitken Jr. became a fighter pilot with 601 Squadron, rising to Wing Commander. He logged 16 victories in World War II and was awarded both a DSO and DFC.

Their daughter Janet Gladys Aitken was married to Ian Campbell, who later became the 11th Duke of Argyll. Together they had one daughter, Lady Jeanne Campbell.

Beaverbrook remained a widower for many years until 1963 when he married Marcia Anastasia Christoforides (1910–1994), the widow of his friend Sir James Dunn.

Beaverbrook was rarely a faithful husband, and even in old age was often accused of treating women with disrespect. In Britain, he established the then-married Jean Norton as his mistress at Cherkley. Aitken left Norton for a Jewish ballet dancer named Lily Ernst whom he had rescued from pre-war Austria.

== Historian ==
After the First World War, Beaverbrook had written Politicians and the Press in 1925, and Politicians and the War in two volumes, the first in 1928 and the second in 1932, republished in one volume in 1960. Upon their original publication, the books were largely ignored by professional historians and the only favourable reviews were in Beaverbrook's own newspapers. However, when the combined edition of Politicians and the War came out, the reviews were more positive. A. J. P. Taylor said it was "Tacitus and Aubrey rolled into one".

Later, Taylor said: "The enduring merits of the book are really beyond cavil. It provides essential testimony for events during a great political crisis...It contains character sketches worthy of Aubrey. On a wider canvas, it displays the behaviour of political leaders in wartime. The narrative is carried along by rare zest and wit, yet with the detached impartiality of the true scholar". Sir John Elliot in 1981 said the work "will remain, despite all carping, the authoritative narrative; nor does the story want in the telling thereof".

Men and Power 1917–1918 was published in 1956. It is not a coherent narrative, but is divided by separate episodes centred on one man, such as Carson, Robertson, Rothermere and others. The reviews were favourable, with Taylor's review in The Observer greatly pleasing Beaverbrook. The book sold over 23,000 copies.

When The Decline and Fall of Lloyd George was published in 1963, favourable reviewers included Clement Attlee, Roy Jenkins, Robert Blake, Lord Longford, Sir C. P. Snow, Lady Violet Bonham Carter, Richard Crossman and Denis Brogan. Kenneth Young said the book was "the finest of all his writing".

Beaverbrook was both admired and despised in Britain, sometimes at the same time: in his 1956 autobiography, David Low quotes H.G. Wells as saying of Beaverbrook: "If ever Max ever gets to Heaven, he won't last long. He will be chucked out for trying to pull off a merger between Heaven and Hell after having secured a controlling interest in key subsidiary companies in both places, of course."

Beaverbrook was of an imperialist mindset, with the quote, "There are countries so underdeveloped today that the gift of independence is like the gift of a razor to a child", attributed to him in a panel discussion on Canadian TV.

== Death ==
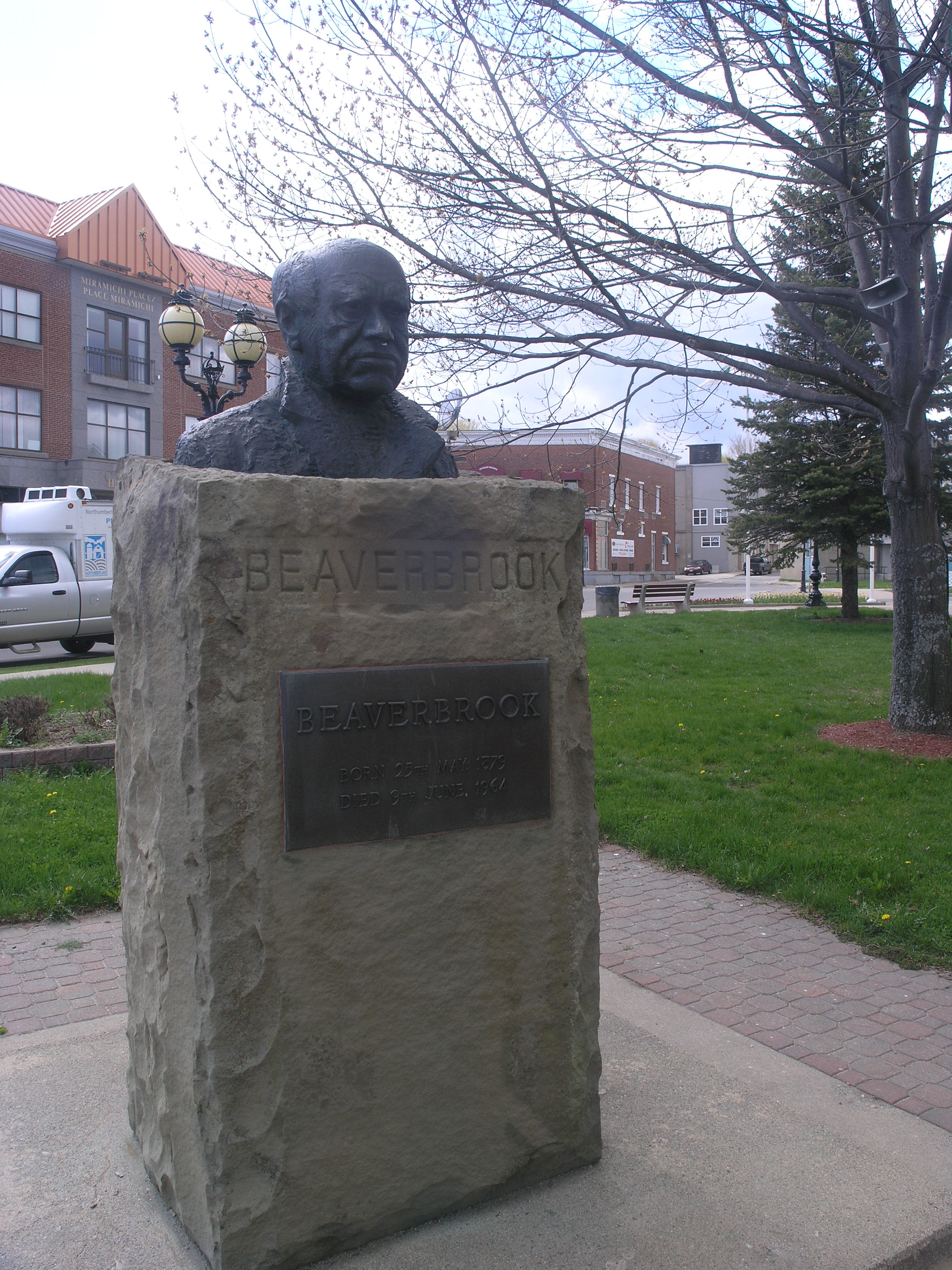
Bust of Lord Beaverbrook, where his ashes are deposited, in the town square of Newcastle, Miramichi, New Brunswick (IR Walker 2008)

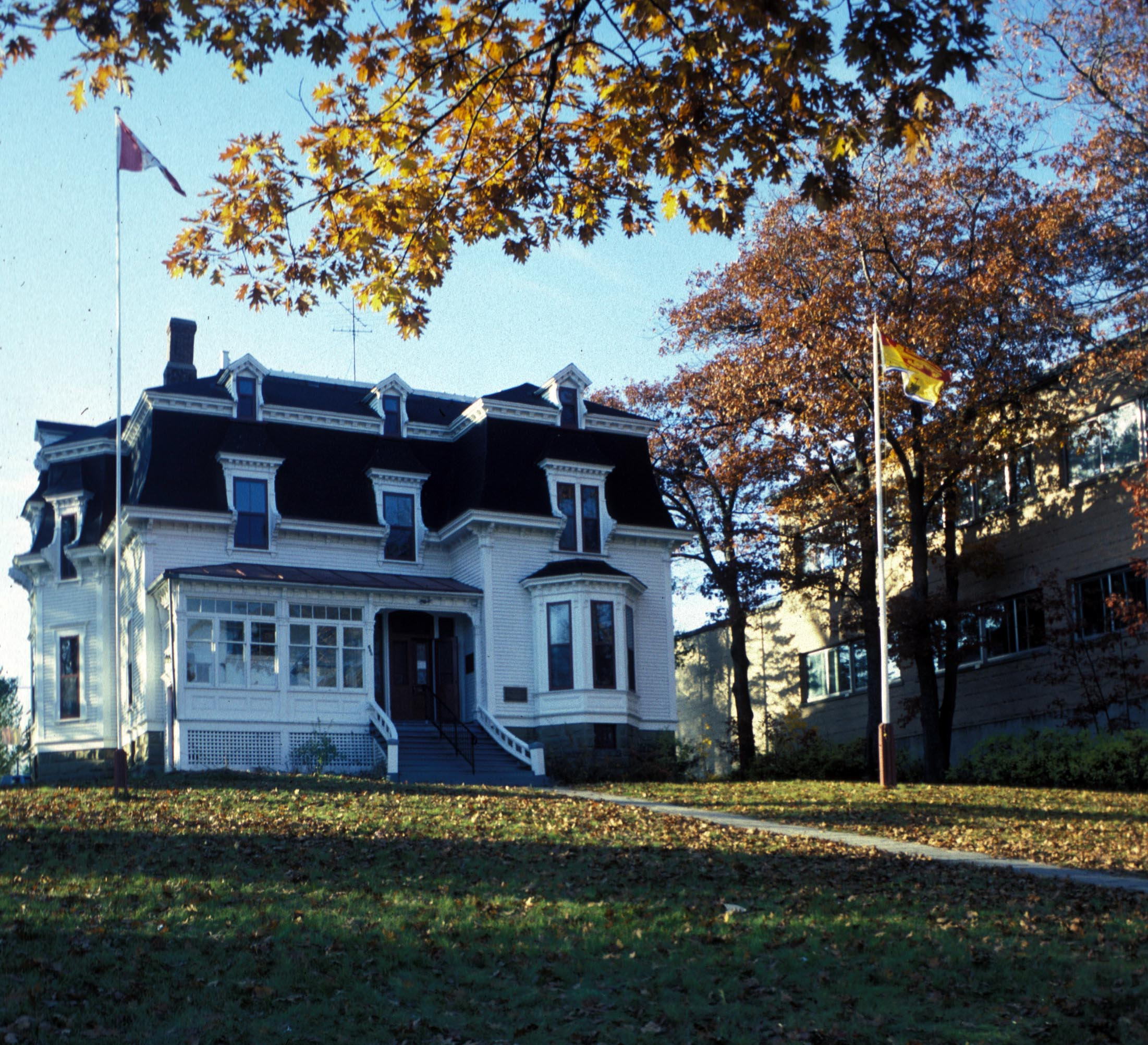
Beaverbrook House, formerly the Old Manse Library, and earlier the boyhood home of Aitken, in Newcastle, Miramichi, New Brunswick (IR Walker 1983)

Lord Beaverbrook died in Leatherhead in 1964, aged 85. He had recently attended a birthday banquet organized by fellow Canadian press baron, Lord Thomson of Fleet, where he was determined to be seen on his usual good form, despite suffering from cancer.

A bust of him by Oscar Nemon stands in the park in the town square of Newcastle, New Brunswick, not far from where he sold newspapers as a young boy. His ashes are in the plinth of the bust.

The Beaverbrook Foundation continues his philanthropic interests. In 1957, a bronze statue of Lord Beaverbrook was erected at the centre of Officers' Square in Fredericton, New Brunswick, paid for by money raised by children throughout the province.

== Legacy ==
Beaverbrook and his wife, Lady Beaverbrook, left a considerable legacy to both New Brunswick and the United Kingdom. In 2014, he was named a National Historic Person on the advice of the Historic Sites and Monuments Board of Canada. He is particularly cherished at the University of New Brunswick, to which he devoted most of his later largesse and at which he situated his extensive archival collection of British public life in the first half of the 20th century. Among other gifts over three years from 1946 he tripled the size of the library at UNB, and bestowed the Old Manse Library in Newcastle Miramichi. He endowed the Lord Beaverbrook Overseas Scholarships to send UNB undergraduates for a spell at the University of London. His legacy, and memorials, includes the following buildings:

- UNB:
  - Aitken House
  - Aitken University Centre
  - Lady Beaverbrook Gymnasium
  - Lady Beaverbrook Residence
  - Beaverbrook House (UNBSJ E-Commerce Centre)
- City of Fredericton, New Brunswick
  - Lady Beaverbrook Arena (formerly operated by the University of New Brunswick)
  - The Beaverbrook Art Gallery, including world-renowned art collection (New Brunswick's provincial gallery)
  - The Fredericton Playhouse
  - Lord Beaverbrook Hotel
  - Lord Beaverbrook statue in Officer's Square
- City of Miramichi, New Brunswick
  - Max Aitken Academy
  - Lord Beaverbrook Arena (LBA)
  - Beaverbrook Kin Centre (formerly the Beaverbrook Theatre and Town Hall)
  - Beaverbrook House (his boyhood home and formerly the Old Manse Library)
  - Lord Beaverbrook bust in Queen Elizabeth Park
  - Aitken Avenue
- City of Campbellton, New Brunswick
  - Lord Beaverbrook School
- City of Saint John, New Brunswick
  - Lord Beaverbrook Rink
- City of Ottawa, Ontario
  - Beaverbrook
- City of Calgary, Alberta
  - Lord Beaverbrook High School
- McGill University
  - The Beaverbrook Chair in Ethics, Media and Communications
- Maple, Ontario
  - Sarah Noble House at 9995 Keele Street was the birthplace of Max Aitken, where his parents lived from 1879 to 1880. A historical marker outside the home commemorates his birth here.

=== Beaverbrook's published works ===
- Canada in Flanders. London: Hodder & Stoughton. 1916.
- Success. Small, Maynard and Company. 1922. 2003: ISBN 978-0-7661-5409-4.
- Politicians and the Press. London: Hutchinson. 1925.
- Politicians and the War, Vol. 1. London: Oldbourne. 1928.
- Politicians and the War, Vol. 2. London: Oldbourne. 1932.
- The Resources of The British Empire. London: Lane. 1934.
- Why Didn't you Help the Finns? Are you in the Hands of the Jews? And 10 Questions, Answers. London: London Express. 1939.
- Spirit of the Soviet Union. London: The Pilot Press. 1942.
- Don't Trust to Luck. London: London Express Newspaper. 1954.
- The Three Keys to Success. London: Hawthorn. 1956.
- Men and Power, 1917–1918. North Haven, Connecticut: The Shoe String Press. 1956.
- Friends: Sixty years of Intimate personal relations with Richard Bedford Bennett. London: Heinemann. 1959.
- Courage, The Story of Sir James Dunn. Fredericton: Brunswick Press. 1961.
- My Early Life. Fredericton: Atlantic Advocate Book. 1962.
- The Divine Propagandist. London: Heinemann. 1962.
- The Decline and Fall of Lloyd George: And Great Was the Fall Thereof. London: Collins. 1963. 1981: ISBN 978-0-313-23007-3
- The Abdication of Edward VIII. New York: Atheneum. 1966.

== In popular culture ==
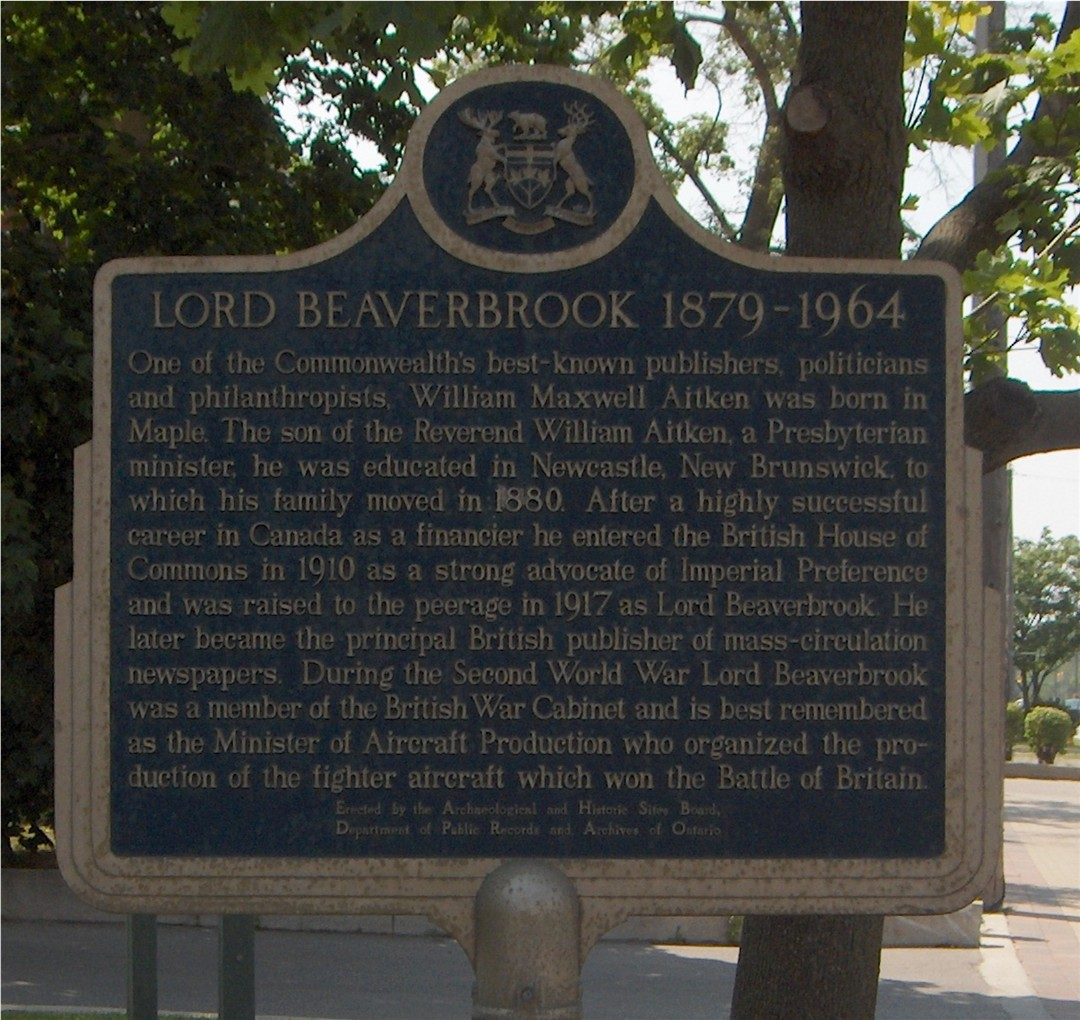
Lord Beaverbrook plaque in Maple, Ontario

For a period of time, Beaverbrook employed novelist Evelyn Waugh in London and abroad. Waugh later lampooned his employer by portraying him as Lord Copper in Scoop and as Lord Monomark in both Put Out More Flags and Vile Bodies.

The Kinks recorded "Mr Churchill Says" for their 1969 album Arthur, which contains the lines: "Mr Beaverbrook says: 'We've gotta save our tin/And all the garden gates and empty cans are gonna make us win...'."

Beaverbrook was one of eight notable Britons cited in Bjørge Lillelien's famous "Your boys took a hell of a beating" commentary at the end of an English football team defeat to Norway in 1981, mentioned alongside British Prime Ministers Churchill, Thatcher and Attlee.

In C. J. Sansom's alternate history novel Dominion, Lord Beaverbrook is the incumbent Prime Minister in 1952, heading a Nazi collaborationist puppet government as a result of the United Kingdom entering into an armistice in 1940.

== Arms ==
Coat of arms of Max Aitken, 1st Baron Beaverbrook
Coronet A Coronet of a Baron Crest Upon a drum proper a cock Gules membered combed and wattled Or Escutcheon Argent two barrulets wavy Azure between in chief two maple leaves and in base a thistle Gules, all within a bordure Sable bezanté Supporters Two beavers regardant each holding in the mouth a fish Motto RES MIHI NON ME REBUS (Latin for 'I suit life to myself, not myself to life')

== See also ==
- Canadian peers and baronets
- Churchill war ministry

== Notes ==
Parliament of the United Kingdom
Preceded by Alfred Scott	Member of Parliament for Ashton-under-Lyne; 1910–1916	Succeeded by Albert Stanley
Political offices
New office	Minister of Information; 1918	Succeeded by The Lord Downham
Preceded by Sir Frederick Cawley	Chancellor of the Duchy of Lancaster; 1918	Succeeded by The Lord Downham
New office	Minister of Aircraft Production; 1940–1941	Succeeded by John Moore-Brabazon
Preceded by Sir Andrew Duncan	Minister of Supply; 1941–1942	Succeeded by Sir Andrew Duncan
New office	Minister of War Production; 1942	Succeeded by Oliver Lyttelton as Minister of Production
Preceded by Viscount Cranborne	Lord Privy Seal; 1943–1945	Succeeded by Arthur Greenwood
Peerage of the United Kingdom
New creation	Baron Beaverbrook; 1917–1964	Succeeded by Max Aitken
Baronetage of the United Kingdom
New creation	Baronet (of Cherkley); 1916–1964	Succeeded by Max Aitken
