= Tibbits Hall =

Canadian university residence

Coordinates: 45°56′36.79″N 66°38′19.13″W

Mary K. Tibbits Hall
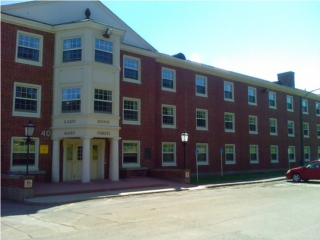
- The residence hall in 2010
- Type: UNB co-ed residence
- Established: 1970
- Students: 97
- Location: Fredericton, NB, Canada
- Colours: red & white
- Nickname: Tibbits Tornadoes

Tibbits Hall is a university residence at University of New Brunswick, Fredericton, New Brunswick, Canada. It was opened as an all-female residence in 1970, but became a co-ed residence in 2012 on the UNB Fredericton campus. The house holds many traditions such as the charity drive Pushing Carts to Warm Hearts, Hawaiian Luau Dance in orientation week and the biggest Halloween Social on campus. The mascot of Tibbits Hall is the Tibbits Tornadoes and the house color consists of red and white.

== History ==
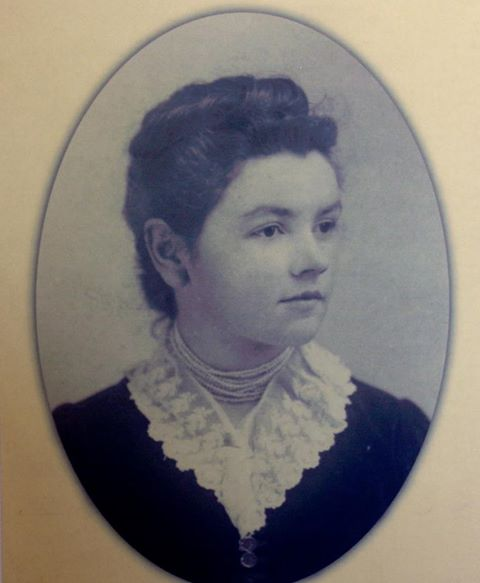
Mary K. Tibbits

Mary K. Tibbits Hall, more commonly known as Tibbits Hall, was established in 1970 as an all-female house. It was named after Mary Kingsley Tibbits (BA, MA, LL.D.) who in 1889 was the first female graduate of the University of New Brunswick. Tibbits Hall was located beside Lady Dunn Hall which was also an all-female residence.

In 1998, Tibbits Hall was joined by Lady Dunn Hall when the residence complex was reconfigured, with the co-ed Joy Kidd House now in the former Lady Dunn Hall building, and Dunn Hall becoming a smaller residence for women behind Kidd House. The three residences formed the Dunn/Kidd/Tibbits "DKT" complex with its own meal hall inside.

In 2011, the house went through a big renovation and had to function as a small residence with approximately 30 female students. During that time, Tibbits residents were moved to the 3T wing of Joy Kidd House. In 2012, UNB Residential Life & Conferencing Services decided to change the house into co-ed style due to the lack of enrolments in single-sex residences. This left UNB Fredericton with only one all-male and one all-female residence (as Neville/Jones, a former all-male residence was made co-ed in 2011-2012). The transition received mixed responses from the residence community and it was one of the most controversial topics of that year.

Started from the school year of 2012 - 2013, Tibbits Hall returned to its original location before the renovation and functioned as a co-ed residence on UNB Fredericton campus. Tibbits saw its first male president in 2013 and remained one of, if not, the best residences on UNB Fredericton campus with great pride and tremendous passion.

== Residence organization and house governance ==
There are fourteen residences at UNB as of 2013, one men's, one women's, ten co-ed, one apartment style, and one suite style residence. Each residence has its own unique characters, cultures and traditions.

=== House team ===
House Don is a university faculty, staff member, or a senior grad student living in the house who is responsible for the operation of Tibbits Hall. The Don is assisted by four hall proctors and an educational proctor who are senior undergraduates with the role of helping the students adjust to residence and university life. The House Team assumes the responsibility for maintaining order within the immediate vicinity of the residence and meal halls, and also has front line responsibility in crisis response.

=== House Committee ===
House Committee led by the house President is a team elected by residents of Tibbits Hall to act as peer leaders. The committee plays the main role in coordinating house social, educational, charity, athletic activities with the assistance from the Residence Coordinator and the House Team.

As of 2013, Tibbits Hall House Committee includes President, Vice President, Male and Female Social Rep, Male and Female Sport Rep, Charity Rep, Merch Rep, Treasurer, Secretary and First Year Rep (aka Frosh Rep). General elections are usually held in March and First Year Rep election is held in September right after orientation week.

=== House Orientation Committee ===
House Orientation Committee (HOC) is a team consists of ten returning residents chosen by the Don and the returning President to welcome first-year students to the house. HOC acts as peer leaders during orientation week to create a welcoming environment to all the first year and make orientation week one of the best experiences of their lives.

Tibbits Hall HOC jersey is red and white basketball jersey with a tornado on the front and HOC's name on the back. Tibbits Hall proctor jersey has the same design with the colors of black and red instead.

== Traditions ==
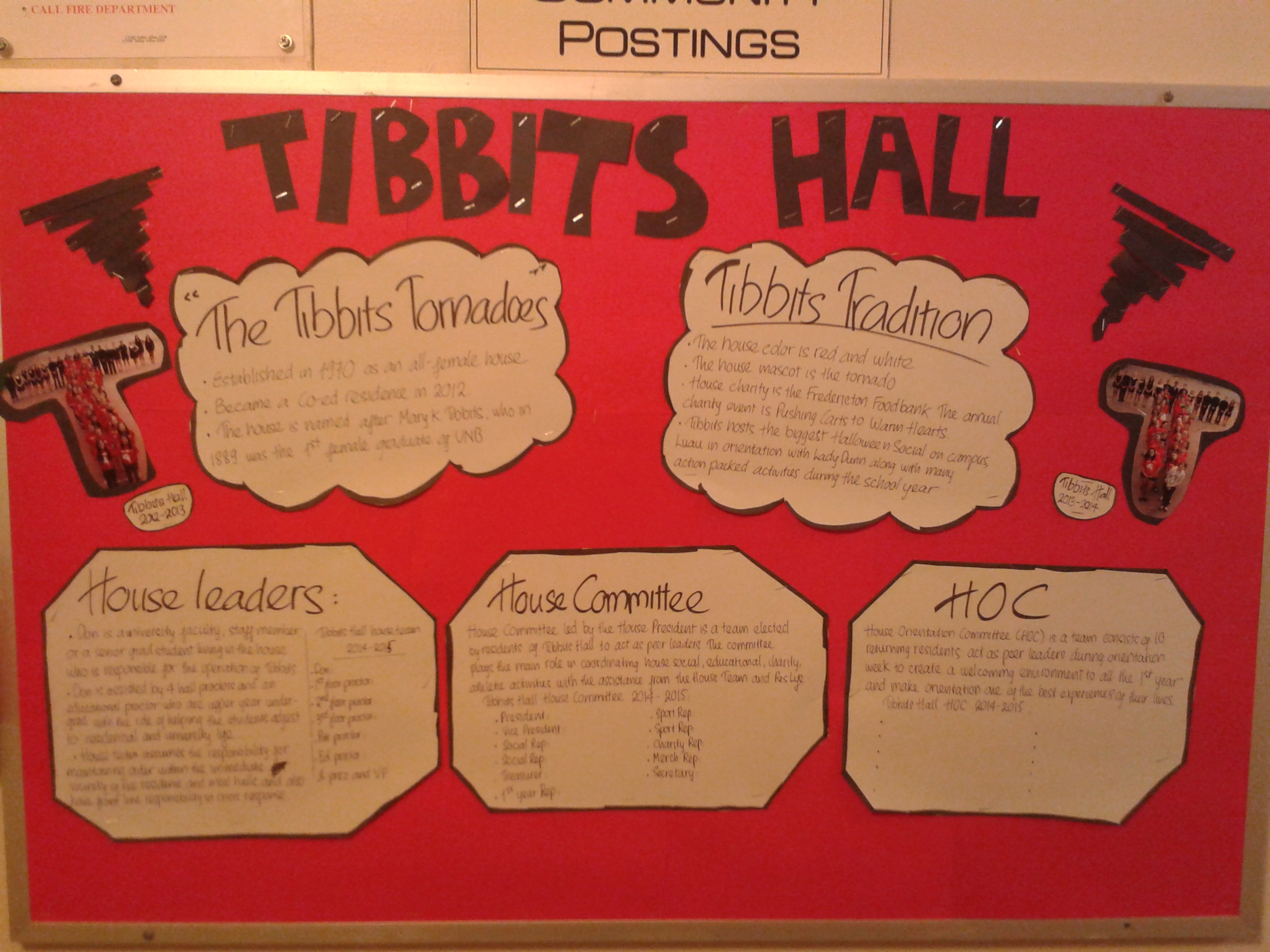
Tibbits Hall Welcoming Board

Before the transition to co-ed residence, Tibbits was well known as the most spirited all-female house on UNB Fredericton campus. Tibbits holds many significant tradition with great pride and tremendous passion.

- Pushing Carts to Warm Hearts: Tibbits Hall is widely known for the charity event Pushing Carts to Warm Hearts in late September. At the event, the residents push carts around city of Fredericton to collect non-perishable food items for Fredericton Food Bank. Every year, the Pushing Cart helps to collect more than 1500 food items for the Fredericton Food Bank and promotes the good deeds of charity activities throughout the community.
- Tibbits Hall Halloween Charity Social: Tibbits throws the biggest Halloween Social on UNB Fredericton campus in DKT cafeteria. All of the dance profit is donated to the Fredericton Foodbank. It is always one of the greatest nights on campus and the winning costumes are amazing.
- Dunn & Tibbits Hawaiian Luau: During orientation week, Lady Dunn and Tibbits hosts an annual joint Luau in the courtyard.
- Cheers & House Song: Tibbits cheers are led by the house President.
- Tibbits Christmas: Happens a week before exam time with Secret Santa and Carol.
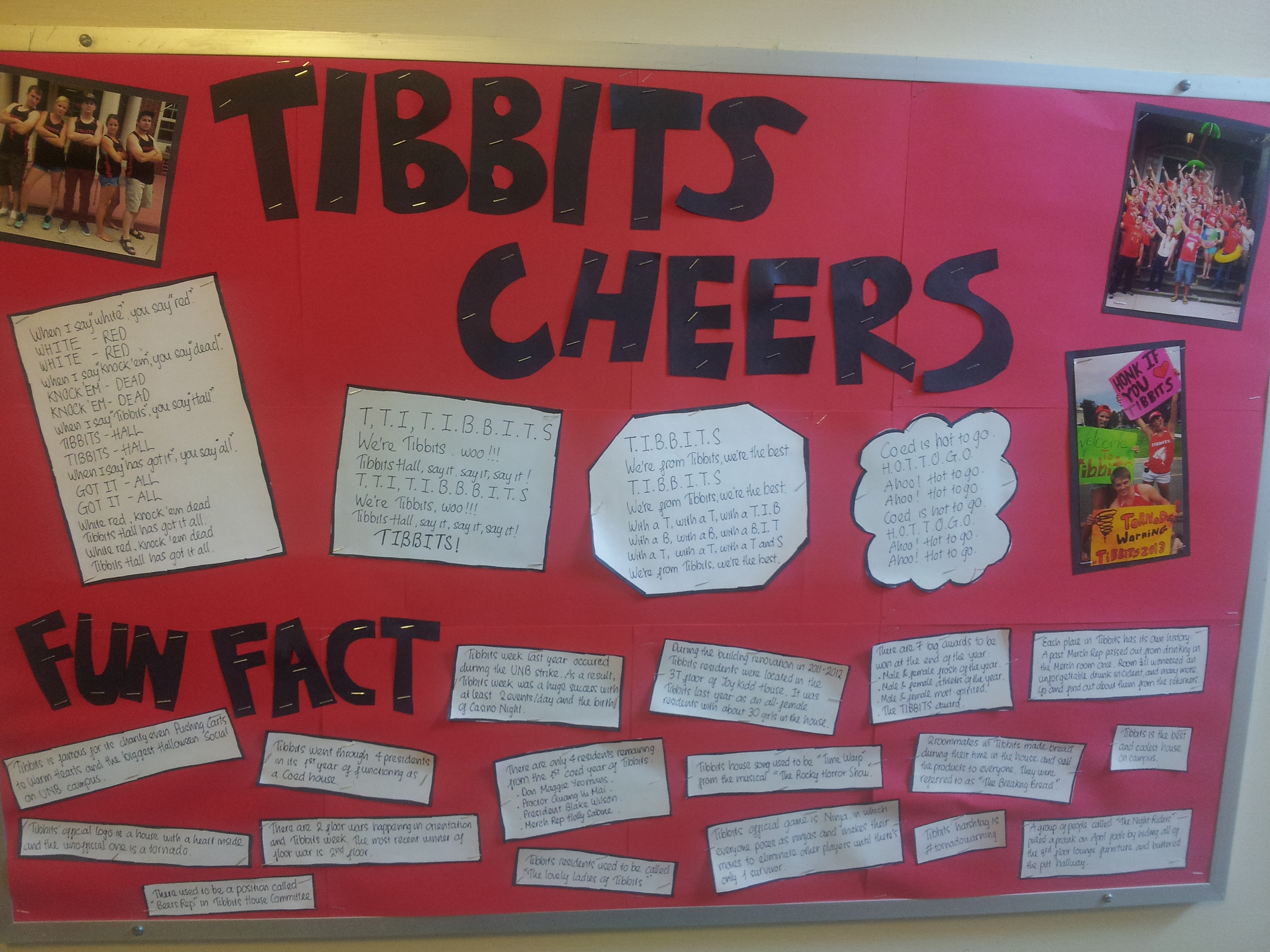
  Tibbits Hall Cheers Board
- Tibbits Week: The last week of January when the house celebrates its tradition, pride, and passion. For the last few years, Tibbits week starts with Roommate Challenge, followed by Sex & Ice Cream, Games Night, Fantasia Party, Casino Night and House formal.
- Ninja: The house unofficial bonding game where everyone poses as ninjas and makes their moves to eliminate other players until there's only one survivor.
- Tibbits Award: As of 2015, there are 7 big awards to be won (the big 7): Male & Female First Year of the year, Male & Female Athlete of the year, Male & Female Most Spirited of the year, The Mary K. Tibbits Award, and the individual awards of excellence.
- House Events: including house social, formal, assassins, pub tours, intramural sports, house supper, and proctor programs.

== Listings of office holders ==
=== Tibbits Hall Presidents ===
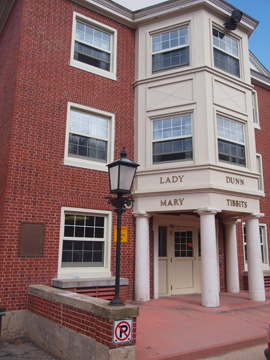
Tibbits Hall main door, shared with Lady Dunn Hall

- 2023-2024 Juliana
- 2022-2023 Mackenzie
- 2021-2022 Sean Ikaia Alviso
- 2019-2020 Kordell Walsh
- 2017-2018 Sean Gray
- 2016-2017 Isayah Vidito
- 2016-2016 Jonathan Nicolle
- 2015-2016 Monica Forestell
- 2015-2015 Erin Callaghan
- 2014-2015 Brendan Dale
- 2013-2014 Quang Vũ Mai
- 2012-2013 Elizabeth Campell / Robert Hanson
- 2011-2012 Robyn Mawer
- 2010-2011 Kealtie Colwell
- 2008-2010 Jessica Seward
- 2007-2008 Laura Houghton
- 2006-2007 Riki Johnston
- 2005-2006 Jill Griffiths
- 2004-2005 Kim Martin
- 2003-2004 Melaine Richardson
- 2002-2003 Jennifer Barry
- 2001-2002 Krystyna Fecteau
- 2000-2001 Caroline Jarvis
- 1999-2000 Jamie-Lynn Rhindress
- 1998-1999 Jocelyn Currie
- 1997-1998 Mandy McLeod
- 1996-1997 Jennifer MacDonald
- 1995-1996 Wendy Robertson
- 1993-1995 Tracy Johnston
- 1992-1993 Anisa Pynn
- 1991-1992 Sherry Flynn
- 1990-1991 Brenda Wilson
- 1989-1990 Norma MacLennan
- 1988-1989 Laura Nowlan
- 1987-1988 Lori Love
- 1986-1987 Lisa DeVos / Natalie Theroux
- 1985-1986 Natalie Theroux
- 1984-1985 Margaret MacLaughlin
- 1983-1984 Kerry Sawyer
- 1982-1983 Janet Thornton
- 1981-1982 Charlene Boyle
- 1980-1981 Lynda Ste Marie
- 1979-1980 Heather Reid
- 1978-1979 Sandra Richardson
- 1977-1978 Lori Hungate
- 1976-1977 Kathy Fider
- 1975-1976 Mary Thornson
- 1974-1975 Dawn Fowler
- 1973-1974 Janet Hogg
- 1972-1973 Gerry Gaunce
- 1971-1972 Jan Moodie
- 1970-1971 Linda Paragis

=== Tibbits Hall Dons ===
- 2015-2017 Serena Smith
- 2014-2015 Brittany Tabor & Michael Tabor
- 2011–2014 Maggie Yeomans
- 2008-2011 Marie-Paule Godin
- 2007-2008 Avelyn Pedro
- 2005-2007 Christopher Ryan
- 2004-2005 Heather Avery
- 2002-2004 Jennifer Roberge-Renaud
- 2001-2002 Sherry Golding
- 2000-2001 Holly Luhning
- 1998-2000 Elizabeth Blaney
- 1989-1998 Carol Jordan-Green
- 1986-1989 Judy West
- 1984-1986 Shelley Courser
- 1983-1984 Teresa Hennebery
- 1982-1983 Kathleen Loo
- 1980-1982 Josie Pobihushchy
- 1979-1980 Patricia Doyle
- 1977-1979 Raylene Johnson
- 1977 Jackie Arsenault
- 1975-1976 Ann Heissner
- 1972-1975 Vicki Girvan
- 1970-1972 Cassie Stanley

== See also ==
- University of New Brunswick
- The Brunswickan
- Aitken House
- Harrison House (Fredericton)
