= Vineyard, Kentucky =

Unincorporated community in Kentucky, United States

- Unincorporated community
- Location within Kentucky Location within the United States
- Coordinates: 37°50′38″N 84°35′16″W
- Country: United States
- State: Kentucky
- County: Jessamine
- Elevation: 906 ft (276 m)
- Time zone: UTC-6 (Central (CST))
  - Summer (DST): UTC-5 (CST)
- GNIS feature ID: 506057

Vineyard is an unincorporated community located in Jessamine County, Kentucky, United States. It has an elevation of 906 ft (276 m).
