= Tebbutt =

Tebbutt is the surname of the following people:

- Carmel Tebbutt (born 1964), Australian politician
- Charles Goodman Tebbutt (1860–1944), English speedskater and bandy player
- Dustin Tebbutt, Australian musician
- Grace Tebbutt (1893–1983), British politician
- Greg Tebbutt (1957–2021), Canadian ice hockey player
- John Tebbutt (1834–1916), Australian astronomer
  - Tebbutt (crater) on the Moon
  - 11212 Tebbutt, a minor planet
- Matt Tebbutt (born 1973), British chef and television food presenter
- Michael Tebbutt (born 1970), Australian former tennis player
