= Tebbit =

Tebbit is a surname. Notable people with the surname include:

- Albert Tebbit (1871–1938), British speed skater
- Donald Tebbit (1920–2010), British diplomat
- Kevin Tebbit (born 1946), British civil servant
- Margaret Tebbit (1934–2020), wife of Norman Tebbit
- Norman Tebbit (1931–2025), British politician

== See also ==
- Tebbitt, a surname
- Ellen Tebbits, a 1951 children's novel
