= Aitken House =

Coordinates: 45°56′47.60″N 66°38′25.69″W

Aitken House is a Canadian residence, historically was an all-male, until 2021 where it was reassigned as a co-ed residence; located on the University of New Brunswick's Fredericton campus. It was established in 1958 and has since been a prominent member of UNB's residence community. The house holds many traditions such as their Club Med beach party, their house dance to the song "Shout" by The Isley Brothers, and their house cheer. Aitken House is the only residence at UNB to have their own alumni association, and has recently celebrated their 60th anniversary, which saw Aitken brothers from 1958 to 2018 attend.

== History ==
Built in 1958 with funding provided by Maxwell Aitken A.K.A. Lord Beaverbrook, Aitken house was the second residence to be built on the UNB Fredericton campus.

In the winter of 2007, UNB Residential Life & Conferencing Services decided that due to a lack of enrollment in residence, they would close Aitken House and attempt to sell it to the university to be turned into an academic building. Although the residence community had seen many buildings come and go throughout its lifetime, the residents and alumni of Aitken House were not ready to let it go without a fight. The majority of the residence community showed their support to keep Aitken House alive through painting red A's in their windows, flying banners, and attending meetings. There were also those who supported ResLife's position and the campus newspaper's letters to the editor section was filled with controversy every week. Throughout the remainder of that academic year, the supporters of Aitken appealed at many meetings to stop the sale of the house. But to their dismay they were unable to stop it along the way. It progressed all the way through to the UNB Board of Governors (BOG) meeting, a step that is usually just a formality. Traditionally only the members of the BOG are allowed to be present during a meeting but they allowed the house to make a presentation as to why the residence building should be spared. As the members of the BOG entered the Wu Center for their meeting, they were greeted by Aitken House residents and supporters mainly from other residences at UNB, all lined up beside each entrance. The meeting went on for hours and everyone went to wait for the final word back at Aitken House. For the first time in UNB BOG's history, a decision was overturned and the House was saved.

== Sports ==
Aitken House always has a good showing at each sporting event, and often is number one among the other UNB residences. Aitken House competes in many of UNB's intramural athletics. Every year the house is found at such sporting events as: Outdoor & Indoor Soccer, Softball & Co-Rec Softball, Flag football, Volleyball & Co-Rec Volleyball, Basketball, Water Polo, Ball Hockey & Ice Hockey, Co-Rec Ultimate Frisbee, and Broom Ball.

== Traditions ==
Aitken House is built on a number of traditions, that are passed down, year after year; the men of Aitken uphold a number of these traditions with pride and passion. Some of the traditions include:

- Club Med - 24 tons of sand is passed, bucket by bucket, into the basement, where a gigantic beach party takes place, every November.
- Aitken Week - One week in January where the house celebrates its history, brotherhood, and alumni.
- Shout - Aitken's song of choice. A special dance accompanies this tune, each time it is played.
- House Cheer - Performed to the Mickey Mouse theme song, all residents chant this with pride.
- Blood Donor Clinics on Campus - Aitken residents volunteer at every blood donor clinic on campus.
- Car Smash - Teamed up with AIDS NB, the house charity, a car is donated, covered in spray-painted stigmas, then smashed to pieces by way of auction. The event began in 2011, and has already grown to be strong tradition.
- Beaver Heist - Students from Aitken sneak into the Lady Beaverbrook Residence and steal their token wooden beaver, known as Salmon.

== Alumni Association ==
Aitken House has UNBs most active and largest Alumni Association to date. With over 580 active members, the Alumni Association focused on representing the Aitken House name with honor, giving back to its members in good times and in bad, and organizing 5-year reunions with the most recent being the 65th reunion held in June, 2023.

If you wish to contact the Alumni Association, or are an Aitken Alumni looking to get on the list, please contact Tyler Belyea via Facebook.

== Presidents ==
2020-2021 George "Trick" Knight
2019-2020 Bilal "Noodle" Sikandar
2018-2019 Brady "Fabbio" Daigle/Bilal "Noodle" Sikandar
2017-2018 Colton "Passion" Rossiter
2016-2017 Matthew "Champ" Parsons-Coady
2015-2016 Riley "Rudder" Stratton
2015-2016 Ben "Ditto" MacKay
2014-2015 Brandon "Skate" Belyea
2013-2014 Matthew "HOC" Sullivan
2012-2013 Matthew "HOC" Sullivan
2011-2012 Tyler "Scrappy" Belyea
2010-2011 Greg "Ginger" Huskilson
2009-2010 Michael "Brohass" Huskilson
2008-2009 Simon "Castle" Pearn
2007-2008 Brian "Trooper" Beaudette
2006-2007 Evan "Hurtin" Green
2005-2006 Artigas "Nelly" Cruz
2004-2005 Nathan "Poncho" Hewitt
2003-2004 Mark "McCrackin" MacEachern
2002-2003 Andrew Murphy
2001-2002 Terry Bludd
2000-2001 Ben Beasley
1999-2000 Brent Thomas
1998-1999 Jamie Hicks
1997-1998 Jason "Bubba" Thorne
1996-1997 Murray Spencer
1995-1996 Mark Atkinson
1994-1995 Mark Atkinson
1989-1990 Jim McGee
1988-1989 Greg Lutes
1982-1983 Rob Henry
1981-1982 Chris Magee
1980-1981 Kevin Harrigan
1979-1980 Jerry Tebo (Byron Boucher)
1978-1979 Rod MacDonald
1972-1973 Mike Keehn

== Man of Aitken ==
2019-2020 Michael "Caretaker" D'Ettore
2018-2019 Bilal "Noodle" Sikandar
2017-2018 Joshua "Lil' Dipper" LeDrew and Colton "Passion" Rossiter
2016-2017 Matthew "Champ" Parsons-Coady
2015-2016 Riley "Rudder" Stratton
2015-2016 Alex "Tag" Battah
2014-2015 Scott "Hotrod" Allen
2013-2014 Lucas "Boardwalk" Swain
2012-2013 Jeff "Whip" Paradis
2011-2012 Tyler "Scrappy" Belyea
2010-2011 Jeremy "Fetch" Misken
2009-2010 Mike "Brohaas" Huskilson
2008-2009 Brian "Trooper" Beaudette
2007-2008 Brian "Trooper" Beaudette
2006-2007 Artigas "Nelly" Cruz
2005-2006 Morgan "Captain" Elsemore
2004-2005 Nathan "Poncho" Hewitt
2003-2004 Mark "McCrackin" MacEachern
2001-2002 James "Load" Shannon
2000-2001 Matthew “Crazy Newf” Adams
1996-1997 Jeffrey Hicks
1993-1994 Aaron "J" Taylor
1981-1982 T. Michael Dunn and Earle Miller
1973-1974 Mike Keehn & Dave Donaldson

== Dons ==
As of the 2017–2018 academic year, Dons are no longer a part of residences at the University of New Brunswick.

2016-2017 Megan Burnside
2015-2016 Randy Campbell and Megan Burnside
2014-2015 Randy Campbell and Megan Burnside
2013-2014 Randy Campbell and Megan Burnside
2012-2013 Mark Graham and Amanda Simmonds
2011-2012 Mark Graham and Amanda Simmonds
2010-2011 Kevin Roy
2009-2010 Kevin Roy
2008-2009 Kevin Roy
2007-2008 Felipe Shum
2006-2007 Felipe Shum
2005-2006 Lauren Rogers
2004-2005 Lisa Sharpe
2003-2004 Lisa Sharpe
2001-2002 Pat Campbell
1992-1993 Fr Monte Peters 1990-1992 Rod Cooper 1977-1984 Rod Cooper
