= The Playhouse (Fredericton) =

Performing arts building in Fredericton, Canada

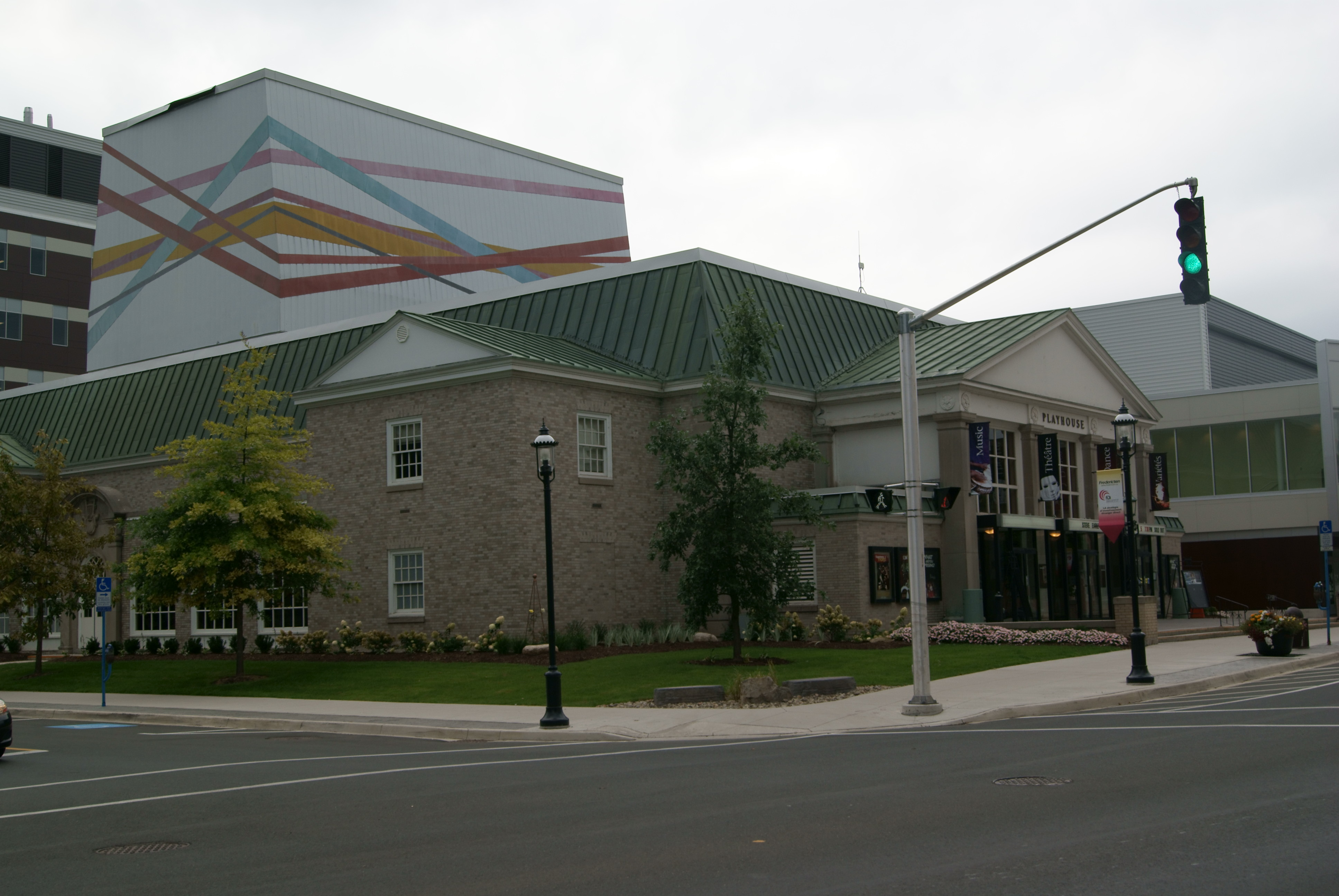
- The theatre in 2011
- Interactive map of The Playhouse
- Address: Fredericton, New Brunswick; Canada
- Coordinates: 45°57′35.8″N 66°38′13.6″W

The Fredericton Playhouse is a non-profit organization venue for hosting local talent acts and touring performers. It was originally constructed in 1964 at the behest of Lady and Lord Beaverbrook, and between the years of 1969 and 2003, the venue was home to Theatre New Brunswick. The Georgian-style building is located adjacent to the provincial legislature in downtown Fredericton, New Brunswick, Canada.

== History ==
- 1964: The playhouse was built as a gift to New Brunswick from Lord Beaverbrook.
- 1972: Renovated with expanded technical capabilities, including the construction of a fly tower. The mural on the fly tower was created by Tom Forrestall.
- 2000: City of Fredericton purchased the theatre.
- 2006: Federal Government of Canada to provide financial support to undertake a complete infrastructure assessment.

== Theatre details ==
- The auditorium has a capacity for 709 people with 469 orchestra seats and 240 balcony seats.
- Photography and video cameras are not permitted without prior consent from the Technical Director.
- Building is accessible by wheelchair.
- The theatre may be reserved for special meetings and receptions.
- James de Beaujeu Domville helped to design the building.
