= The Vineyard, Fulham =

Coordinates: 51°28′13″N 0°12′15″W

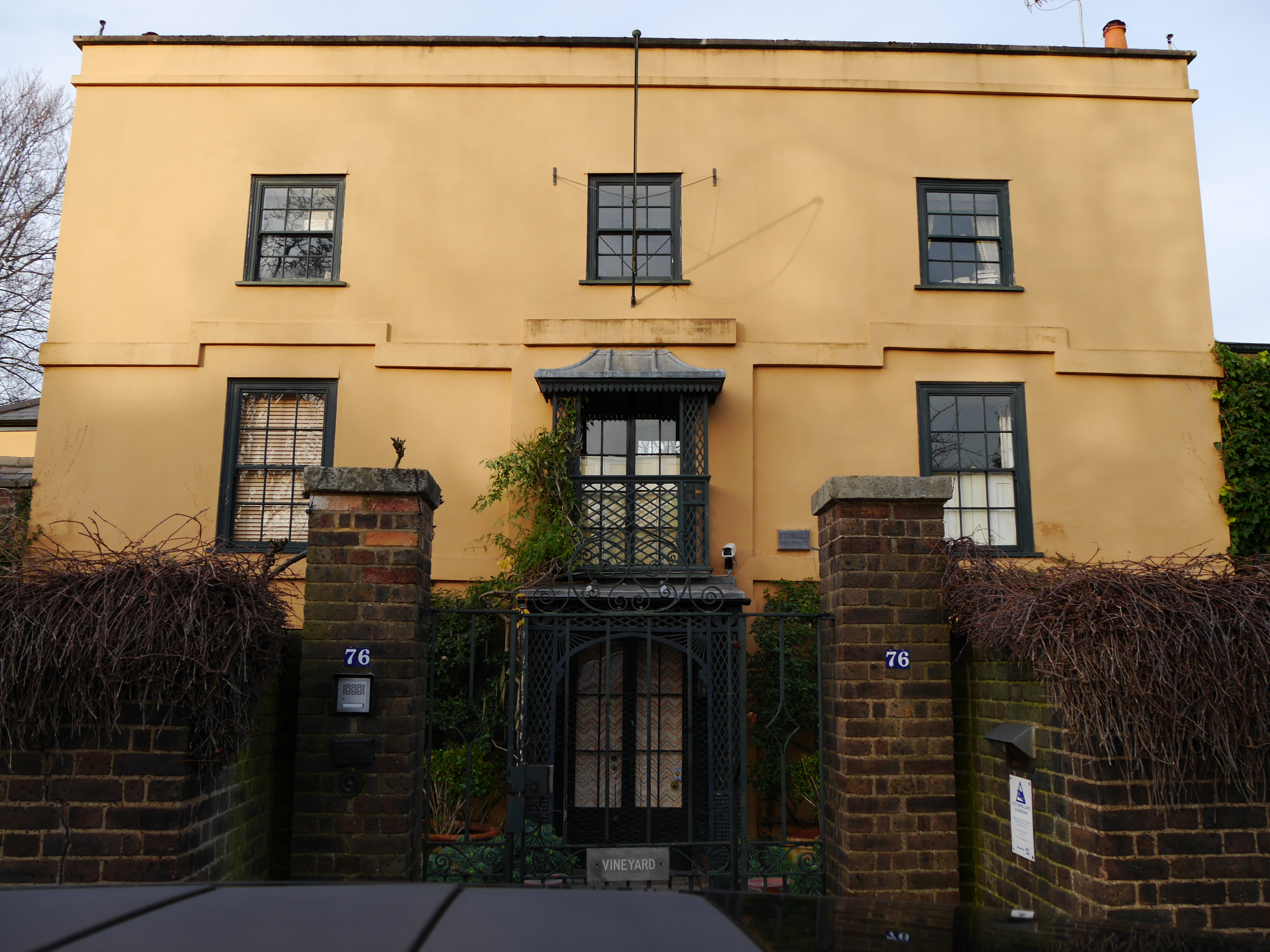
The Vineyard, Fulham

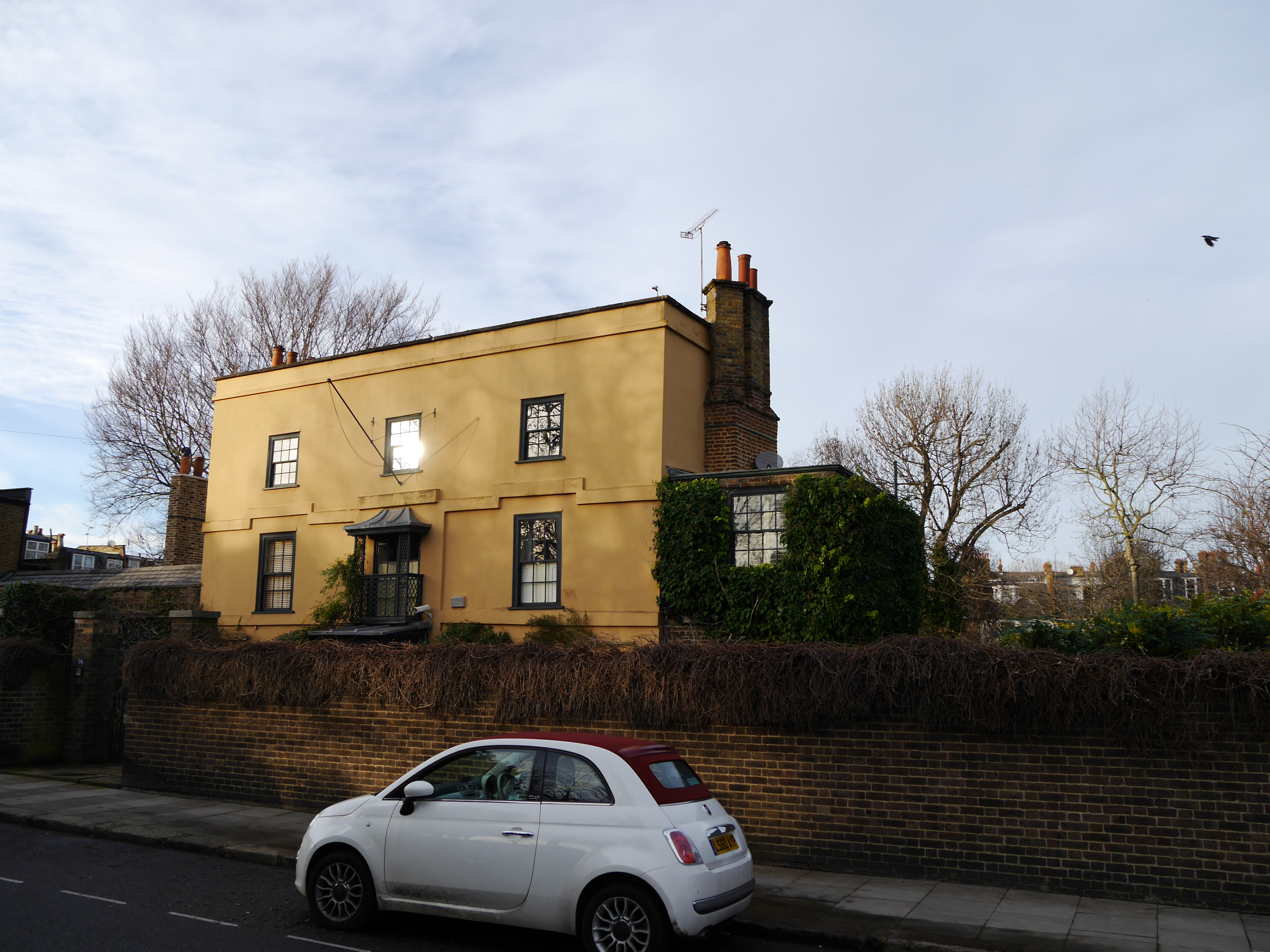
The Vineyard (showing the garden)

The Vineyard is a Grade II listed house at 79 Hurlingham Road, Fulham, London.

It was built in the early 17th century, and has 18th century alterations, and probably the largest private garden in the London Borough of Hammersmith and Fulham.

In 1918, The Vineyard was purchased by the press baron Max Aitken, Lord Beaverbrook, and he lived there from 1921 to 1947. Winston Churchill was a frequent visitor. The house remained in the ownership of the Beaverbrook family until the 1990s.
