= Tibbits Brook =

Stream in Sherburne County, Minnesota, U.S.

Coordinates: 45°20′07″N 93°39′31″W

Tibbits Brook is a stream in Sherburne County, in the U.S. state of Minnesota.

Tibbits Brook was named after four brothers who settled near the stream.

== See also ==
- List of rivers of Minnesota
