= George Mortimer Tibbits =

American landowner

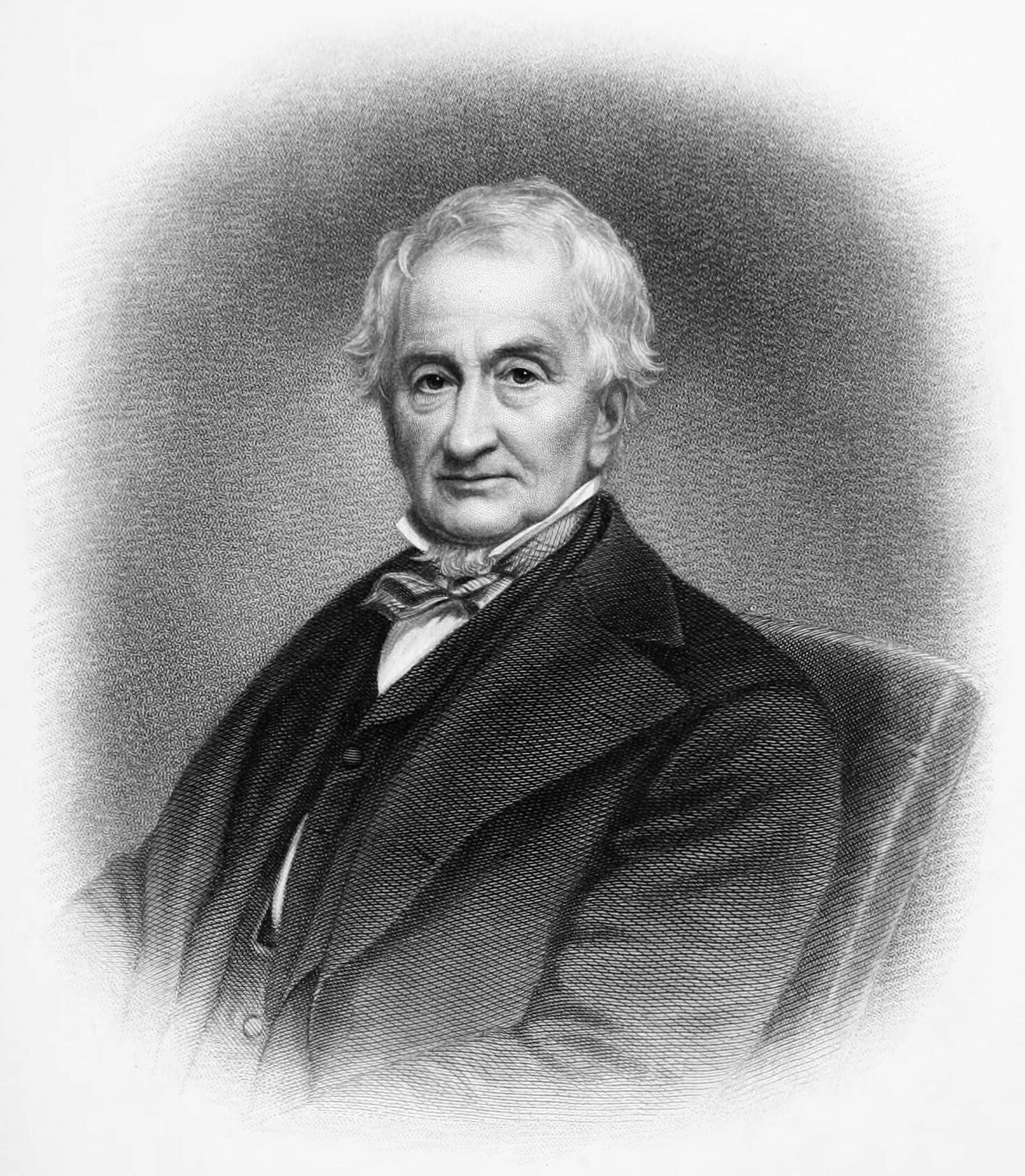

George Mortimer Tibbits (December 5, 1796 – July 19, 1878) was an American landowner, livestock farmer, and art connoisseur.

== Life ==
George Mortimer Tibbits was born in Lansingburgh, New York, on December 5, 1796. He was the eldest child of George and Sarah Noyes Tibbits. About the middle of the year 1797 and when he was about six months old, his parents removed to Troy. He was taught the rudiments of learning at such schools as the village of Troy then afforded, until sent to Lenox, in Berkshire County, Massachusetts, where he received the instructions of a Mr. Gleason, and by him was fitted tor college. Having admitted to Union college, he was graduated thence in 1817. Among his classmates were his cousin, Benjamin Tibbits, of Albany, Joel B. Nott, of Guilderland, Charles F. Ingalls, of Greenwich, and Daniel Gardner, of Troy.

To him the life of home was happiest, and either with his family, or amid his books, were passed his happiest hours. He was particularly fond of the French language, and until his mental faculties began to fail him he read almost daily some of the literature of that nation. He entered the communion of the Episcopal church when a young man, and was always scrupulous in the observances of religious worship. He maintained until his last illness the order of family prayer in his household, and was regular in his attendance thereon whenever the time appointed for the service had come. In the latter part of his life he favored the movement known as the Reformed Episcopal church, which was promulgated by the Rev. Dr. Cummins, and, owing to his evangelical ideas, he readily found fellowship and communion with many bodies of Christians.

His devotional nature found further expansion in the stone church which he erected at Hoosick, and which was in the pastoral care of his son, the Rev. John B. Tibbits. So entirely was he penetrated with the importance of public worship, that he often expressed a belief that great good might be accomplished if a building could be provided devoted to the public service of God and the diffusion of religious knowledge irrespective of any particular creed or form of worship, and open at all proper times for the attendance of the people.

He died in Troy, on Friday, July 19, 1878, at five o'clock in the morning, aged eighty-two years. He left an estate of $2,000,000.

== Sources ==
- Sylvester, Nathaniel Bartlett (1880). History of Rensselaer Co., New York. Philadelphia: Everts & Peck. pp. 89, 192ꜰ–192ɢ.
- "Death of a Troy Millionaire". The New York Times. July 20, 1878. p. 1.
