= Luther C. Tibbets =

American merchant and farmer (1820–1902)

Luther Calvin Tibbets (June 26, 1820 – July 21, 1902) was a Maine merchant and farmer who supplied the federal government from New York City during the American Civil War, had a store in Virginia after the war, and moved to Riverside, California in 1870 as one of the early pioneers. He sold retail goods and then wholesale goods to the federal government from New York City during the American Civil War. With his wife Eliza Tibbets, he was known for growing the first two Washington Navel orange trees (from grafts) in Riverside, California about 1875. Their success and the qualities of the fruit resulted in a conversion of citrus orchards to this variety and rapid expansion of the California citrus industry.

== Early life and education ==
Luther C. Tibbets was born in South Berwick, York County, Maine, to a farming family. He learned about many aspects of farming as a boy and had some education in local schools. He started clerking at local stores.

== Work ==
Tibbets began working in the mercantile grocery business. During the American Civil War, while based in New York City, he was successfully involved in wholesale grain and cereal dealing with the federal government. He said he refused to become involved in corrupt operations, and could not compete with rivals, who drew off most of his business.

In 1863, he began a relationship with Eliza Lovell Reveal, but they did not marry for several years. After the Civil War and a short period in Tennessee, the couple relocated in 1867 to Fredericksburg, Virginia, where he had a store. He identified as a Radical Republican and complained in affidavits to the military Reconstruction government about treatment by local businessmen and courts. White Southerners were hostile to those they considered carpetbaggers and the couple suffered persecution. Tibbets was litigious while in business in the post-United States Civil War southern states. Tibbets was involved in a number of lawsuits and complained of threats, purportedly by Ku Klux Klan members. He gave law enforcement letters which he said had been delivered to him, threatening KKK action unless he left town.

In 1867, Tibbets proposed a development plan for what he called a colony near Fredericksburg of about 30,000 acres, believing plantations and other properties could be subdivided into portions of a variety of sizes, to include 100 farms of 100 acres each, with increasingly smaller farms closer to the village, which would have residential lots. He planned also to provide 'cabins' for Negroes, barns, sheds and outbuildings, and to sell land to anyone of any race, acting as the land agent or broker for the development. He floated this proposal in Philadelphia, New York, and Boston, and had preliminary discussions with an Isaac L. Platt, a businessman from New York who went to Virginia to meet him and look at property. The project became very confused and litigated, with sons of Platt saying he was incapable of making the business transaction and suing for the 3500 dollars which he had paid Tibbets by check. The deal was cancelled at last. Under pressure, Tibbets and his extended family left Fredericksburg in September 1868.

Tibbets and Eliza moved with their family to Washington, DC, for a few years. He led the way to California, moving in 1870 and becoming one of the early pioneers in Riverside.

Tibbets died in 1902, and is buried with his wife Eliza at the Evergreen Memorial Park and Cemetery in Riverside.

== Navel orange introduction ==
In 1873 Eliza Tibbets received two new grafted orange trees to grow and test, from the botanist William Saunders, the Director of the new U.S. Department of Agriculture in Washington, D.C. He had ordered the original cuttings from Bahia, Brazil.

The seedless Washington Navel oranges became very popular, and growers requested graft stock from the Tibbets. As a hybrid, this is the only way the orange can be propagated. The Tibbets sold buds for grafts at a "reasonable price" to fellow growers, not wanting to profit from the government's gift.

== Marriage and family ==
Tibbets was married twice before Eliza and had a total of five children, including Harriet, Francis J., Joanna F., Luther Calvin, Jr. and Minnie Tibbets. Harriet married Eliza's son, James B. Summons, from her first marriage. The two couples and some of Luther's children, including Francis, moved to Fredericksburg, Virginia, for a couple of years after the Civil War. Tibbets owned and ran a store there with Summons. In California, they raised a granddaughter, child of Harriet and James Summons, who was killed in a drowning accident in 1878, the same year the senior couple had to declare bankruptcy.

== See also ==
- Mother Orange Tree
- California Citrus State Historic Park
