= Latinos in Riverside County =

Riverside County extends out to the California-Arizona border

Latino Task Force Report in the Year 2000-Health Promotion Objectives and Recommendations for California

The Inland Empire is one of California's growing regions with a diverse population. Riverside County is now recognized for its longstanding Latino Community. This community was built by pioneering immigrants, migrant workers and entrepreneurs, community organizers and civil rights leaders, teachers and artists, business owners, and volunteers over several generations. For over 100 years, the Latino community has played a role in Riverside county's development and economic growth. Latinos have established and grown communities and in 2024, Latinos made up 52.96 percent of Riverside's population.

== Emergence of the Latino community in Riverside County ==
Riverside County, like many areas of the Southwestern United States, has a varied history of migration, habitation, development, and inter-cultural conflict. Indigenous groups such as the Gabrielino-Tongva, Cachuilla-Lusieno, and Serrano people inhabited coastal Southern California to the Los Angeles and Santa Ana river basins. In the late-1700's, the Spanish introduced the mission system, which simultaneously strove to convert Indigenous communities to Christianity while using their labor to advance Spain's colonial project. The Spanish missions in California was the beginning of generations of injustice for nonwhites in what would become Riverside County. Over time, increasing encroachment on Native land by European and Anglo-American settlers pushed Indigenous communities further east. Despite this history of marginalization and displacement, groups like the Cahuilla Band of Indians and Soboba Band of Luiseno Indians have created thriving communities and industries in the eastern part of Riverside County.

Riverside County experienced significant agricultural development after colonization, particularly with the introduction of the Washington Navel Orange by Eliza Tibbets in 1870. By 1880, Riverside County was recognized for its vineyards, citrus orchards, dairies, and rich agricultural valleys. Chinese immigrants, followed by Korean, Japanese, and Mexican immigrants, provided the primary source of citrus labor. In the early twentieth century, a new wave of anti-immigrant sentiment aimed at the Japanese led to a decline in Japanese participation. This decline was followed by Mexican laborers, who became a central part of the workforce in the agricultural sector. Mexicanos dominated the labor force in these agricultural valleys throughout most of the twentieth century. In the mid-1920s, the push-pull factors of the Mexican Revolution and US policy impacted the character of the workplace. Mexicanos settled in Casa Blanca, Corona, Eastvale, Riverside, Ranchos in Rubiduox, and Mira Loma. Mexican-American workers, both men and women, took part in this workforce, with men serving as pickers and women working in packing and grading jobs Many citrus workers noted the contributions of Mexican workers, emphasizing their role in maintaining a consistent labor supply. Some people associate Mexicans with traits such as loyalty, tirelessness, and reliability.

Beginning in World War II, new employment opportunities emerged as Americans went to war, leading many long-time agricultural workers to seek better job prospects. This shift created a labor shortage for ranchers. In response, the Bracero program was established in 1942, three years before the end of the war. The employment of Braceros was viewed by ranchers as a solution to the labor shortage, as they often had lower labor costs compared to Mexican Americans.

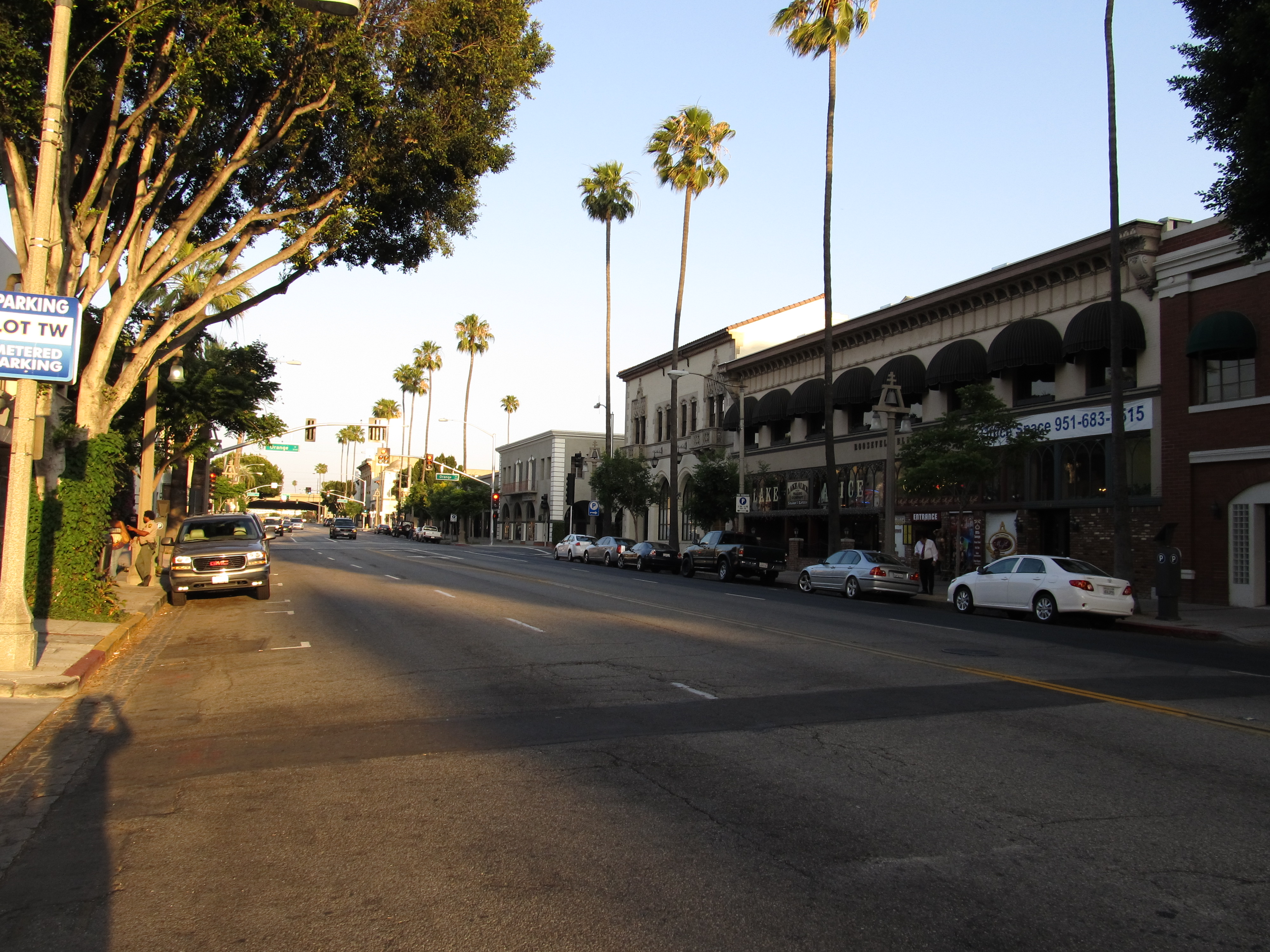
Downtown Riverside, California

Riverside is located one hour from Los Angeles and is one of the largest counties in the United States. The rapid demographic transformation during the 1990s continued through the early twenty-first century. Latino- migrants and second and third generations- have been driving up the Latino community. Mexicans represent the majority of the population in Riverside County. Salvadorans and Guatemalans are also present, though their communities are smaller in size.

== Demographics and growth ==
The demographic transformation in Riverside County mirrors the changes happening throughout the Inland Empire. In 2000, Latinos made up 36.2% of Riverside County; in 2010, the census data revealed that the Latino population in Riverside County made up 45.5%. This transformation can be explained by the impact of neoliberal policies and the North American Free Trade Agreement (NAFTA) tremendous impact on reshaping Southern California's economy from one based on stable, full-time positions to one that emphasizes flexibility and adaptability among workers, reflecting broader trends in global capitalism and labor dynamics. In 2022, Riverside County was less diverse than in 2010, meaning whites comprised 31.3% of the population while Hispanic/Latino populations grew, increasing 6.4 percentage points to 52%. At the same time, patterns show us how the origins of Hispanics have been changing. Between 2010 and 2020, the fastest-growing origin groups were Venezuelans (up 126%), Guatemalans (up 49%), and Hondurans (up 47%).

== Education and youth ==
The Mexican population was growing because of the citrus industry, which boomed from the 1880s to 1950s, and construction on the Salt Lake Bridge over the Santa Ana River. Segregation in Riverside County began in 1874, leading to unequal education for Chicano and other ethnic minority children. An example of this was when the Trujillo School District was built to serve the residents of La Placita. La Placita was a community where many Latinos resided in from the group of settlers Lorenzo Trujillo brought in the mid 1840's. This district began to separate the Mexican Community from Riverside. In 1906, the Riverside City School District reaffirmed the 1874 segregation policy decision by stating that students must attend the school district based on their residential neighborhoods.

On January 1, 1962, Littleworth was elected school board president. On June 14, 1962, the California State Board of Education first considered eliminating segregation, and on October 23, 1962, it required its elimination.

On March 18, 1963, Riverside changed methods for school boundary studies to avoid de facto segregation. "Black and Mexican-American students from Irving and Lowell Schools, as well as Casa Blanca School, where were nearly all minority enrollment, would be bused to Highland and Hyatt Schools."

In Corona, a city located in Riverside County, Mexican parents encountered resistance from the all-Anglo Corona School Board when they tried to have their children attend Anglo schools. Hilarion López, who attended Lincoln Elementary School in the early 1920s, wanted to enroll his son in the same school but was instructed to enroll him at Washington, the "Mexican school." He recalled that unlike the Lincoln and Jefferson schools, Washington Elementary School "did not even have air conditioning." López shared his story during one of the board meetings to discuss school zone boundaries. School board members defended their position by citing the Mexican children's supposed lack of English-language proficiency, cultural differences, and deficient personal hygiene. The school superintendent, F. E. Bishop, asserted to the parents that children from the all-Anglo neighborhood of Home Gardens were more capable learners, implying that integration could negatively affect them.

After studying the 1930 Lemon Grove and 1946 Westminster school desegregation suits, Mexican Americans believed their legal basis was strong enough to advocate for their children. They began lobbying school board officials to allow Mexican children to attend the Lincoln and Jefferson elementary schools. As Frances Martínez explained, "We tried talking to the school, but since the Mexicans who were American citizens never voted, they laughed in our faces." The newly formed Mexican Coordination Council, composed of Los Amigos members and Mexican parents, challenged the school board's zoning policy. At a meeting in September 1944, more than 150 Mexican parents expressed their frustration. Mexican citizens argued that separating Mexican children was contrary to democratic principles. To strengthen their case, the Mexican Coordination Council gained the support of Anglo supporters and Mexican consul Edmundo González from the San Bernardino office. At the school board meeting, González stated that "segregation of Mexican children is not justified and is opposed to the fundamental principles of education.

Today, many school districts and scholars have developed student assignment approaches that consider racial and ethnic diversity. However, many individuals have noted that district zones often lead to segregation, as students attend schools based on their designated residentials known as SAZ. Various strategies, including public school choice, magnet schools, and busing of students within and across multiple school districts have been implemented to promote desegregation. For example, current data from the 2015–2016 NCES CCD indicates that 30 elementary schools at RUSD offer 1st grade. The total number of enrolled students for 1st grade is 2,890, with 625 non-Hispanic White students and 2265 students of minorities. Many have suggested adjusting the SAZ zones to reduce segregation.

== Cultural contributions ==
Catholicism was the primary religion of many Mexican Americans as well as Mexican migrants. As time passed and more generations emerged, Catholicism grew within the Latino communities in Riverside County. Churches served as main places of worship but also served many other purposes. Churches also served as venues where many Latinos hosted events such as dances, fundraisers, movie nights, and community celebrations.

Although Catholicism was predominant, there existed a small number of Chicanos who identified as Presbyterian, Baptists, and other denominations. Churches offered safe havens for Mexican immigrants facing persecution and hostility in their workplace or communities, with their faith providing support.

Cinco de Mayo, September 16, Easter, Christmas, the Feast of Our Lady of Guadalupe, Posadas, and Cinco De Mayo, are important occasions in the Chicano history. Chicanos valued these days as critical days to celebrate and educate their communities. Sports were a pivotal part of Latino leisure activities in Riverside County. Latino males used sports to express their physical prowess.

== Rise of the warehouse empire ==
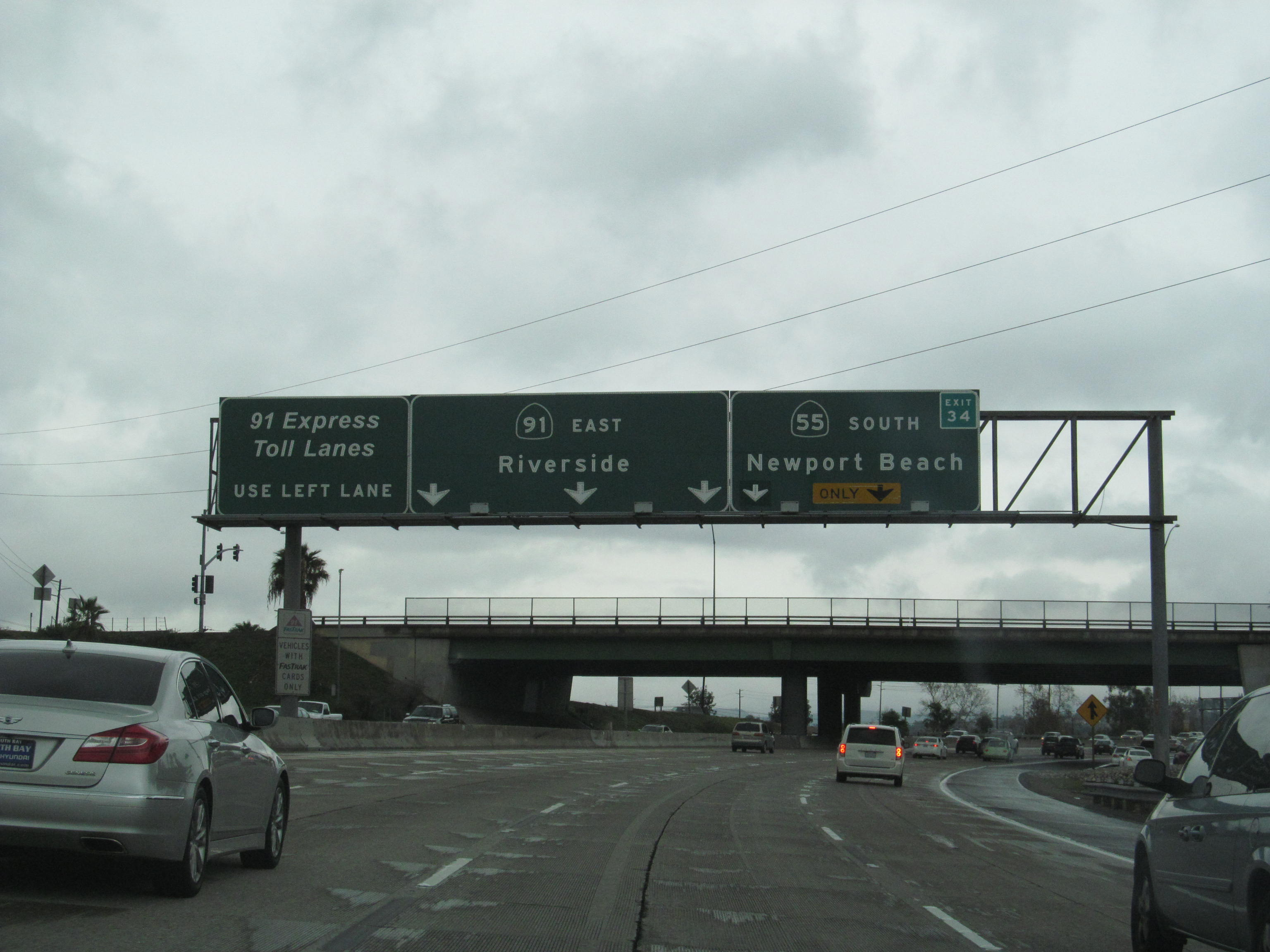
California State Highway 91

In the mid-1990s, high-tech warehouses emerged in the Inland Empire, leading to significant changes in land use. Many vineyards were torn up within this decade, and dairy farms moved to the Central Valley or beyond. Many vacant fields were quickly transformed into modern distribution centers in Ontario, San Bernardino, Moreno Valley, and Perris. The volume that passes through the Inland Empire region is genuinely enormous. This region plays a crucial role in the logistics chain, as over 45 percent of the nation's imports are unloaded at nearby ports, with around two thousand container ships arriving each year. The imported goods are then transported to the Inland Empire for distribution. Some of these distribution centers are known as Amazon, Mattel, Sketchers USA, and Stater Brothers. However, the growth of warehouses has also contributed to elevated air pollution levels in the eastern Inland Empire, including Riverside County. Many of these warehouse jobs are characterized as low-paying and hazardous, and in 2013, distribution centers employed approximately 118,000 workers, influencing demographic changes. Many Latinos have been moving to the Inland Empire to occupy these jobs and become the majority population.
