= Tibs (disambiguation) =

Tibs or TIBS may refer to:

- Tibs, a form of Ethiopian cuisine or Eritrean cuisine, Djiboutian cuisine
- SMRT Buses, a bus operator in Singapore formerly known as the Trans Island Bus Service
- Tibs the Great, British Post Office cat
- Trojan.Tibs, an alternate name of the Storm Worm computer virus

== See also ==
- TIB (disambiguation)
- Tibbs (disambiguation)
