= California Citrus State Historic Park =

Open-air museum in Riverside, California, US

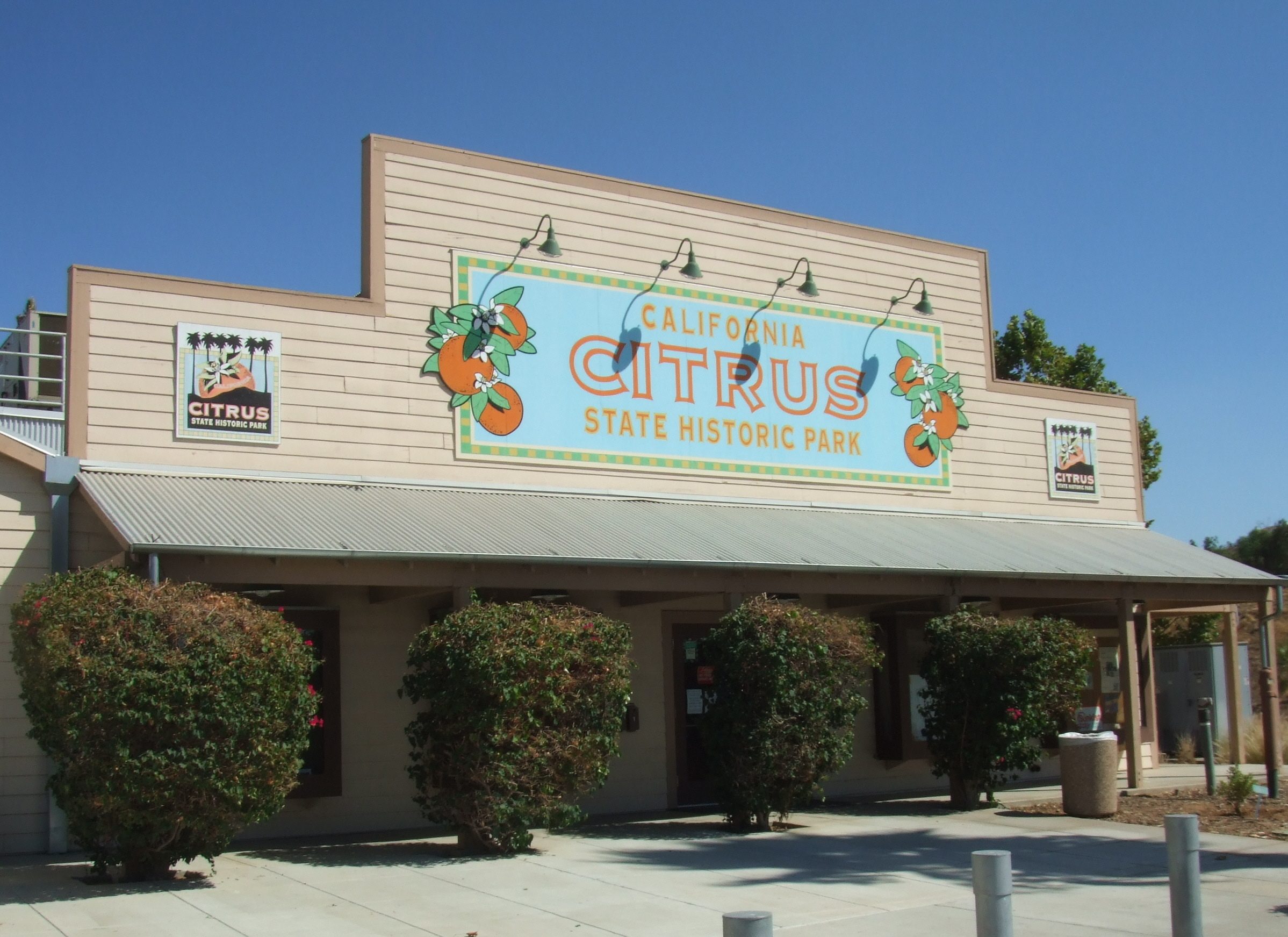
- The California Citrus State Historic Park visitor center
- Interactive map of California Citrus State Historic Park
- Location: Riverside, California, United States
- Area: 248 acres (100 ha)
- Established: 1993
- Governing body: California Department of Parks and Recreation

California Citrus State Historic Park is an open-air museum in the city of Riverside, California, United States. As part of the state park system of California, it interprets the historic cultural landscape of the citrus industry. The park’s museum exhibits and interpretive features share the story of the citrus industry's role in the history and development of Southern California, and is told through the experiences of the diverse migrant and immigrant groups who made it all possible. The 248-acre (100 ha) park was established in 1993.

This California State Historic Park reveals the cultural, political, and environmental aspects of the time when "Citrus was King" in California, especially the Navel orange from Riverside, and recognizing the importance of the citrus industry in Southern California.

== Context ==
In 1873, Riverside resident Eliza Tibbets planted two orange trees from the U.S. Department of Agriculture. The success of these trees launched the orange industry in the area.

== Description ==
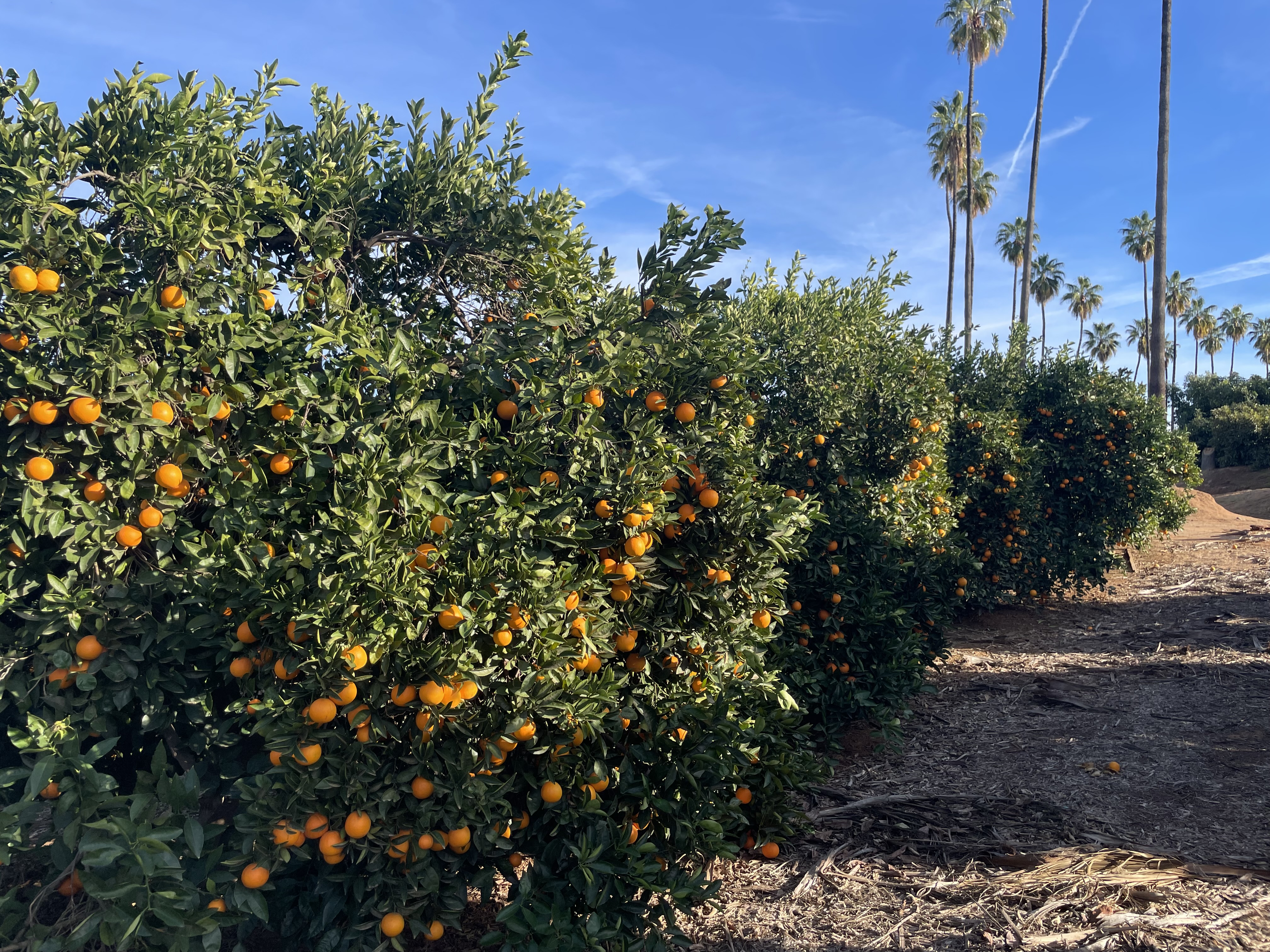
Orange Groves at the park

The design of the park is reminiscent of a 1900s city park, complete with an activity center, interpretive structure, amphitheater, picnic area, and demonstration groves of citrus tree orchards. The land contained within the park still continues to produce high-quality fruits. Free samples of the unique citrus fruits are available for visitors.

The park's visitor center houses a museum about California's citrus industry, and antique citrus grove farm equipment is on display around the park.

== In popular culture ==
In 2002 Huell Howser Productions, in association with KCET/Los Angeles, featured the park in California's Golden Parks.

== See also ==
- Agricultural Museum (periodical)
- Citrus production
- Citrus greening disease
- List of food and beverage museums
- Mother Orange Tree
- Orcutt Ranch Horticulture Center
- The Orange Show
- Washington navel orange tree (Riverside, California)
