= Tibbitt =

Tibbitt may refer to:

- Paul Tibbitt, the showrunner of SpongeBob SquarePants from 2005 to 2015
- Tibbitt Lake, a lake in Northwest Territories

== See also ==
- Tibbetts (disambiguation)
