= Tibbs (surname) =

Tibbs is an English-language patronymic surname from a short form the medieval given names Tebald or Tibalt. Notable people with the name include:

- Andrew Tibbs (1929–1991), American urban blues singer
- Bill Tibbs (1931–2009), Canadian ice hockey player
- Casey Tibbs (1929–1990), American rodeo cowboy and film actor
- Casey Tibbs (paralympian), American Paralympic athlete
- Chris Tibbs (born 1977), Canadian politician
- Delbert Tibbs (1939–2013), American poet
- Gary Tibbs (born 1958), British musician
- Henry Tibbs (1877–1943), English rector
- James Tibbs (1855–1924), New Zealand school principal
- James Tibbs III (born 2002), American baseball player
- Jaron Tibbs (born 2005), American football player
- Jay Tibbs (born 1962), American baseball player
- John Tibbs (born 1990), American Christian musician
- Kim Tibbs, American singer-songwriter
- Philip Tibbs (fl. 1859–1907), Irish priest
- Sue Tibbs (1934–2012), American politician
- William Henry Tibbs (1816–1906), American politician

== Fictional characters ==
- Miss Tibbs, a character from the sitcom Fawlty Towers
- Virgil Tibbs, from the novel In the Heat of the Night

== See also ==
- Tibbs (disambiguation)
- Tebbetts (surname)
- Tibbets
- Tibbett
- Tibbetts
