= Tibbets =

Tibbets, a variant spelling of Tibbetts, is an English-language patronymic surname from the given names Tebald or Tibalt. Notable people with the name include:

- Andrew W. Tibbets (c. 1830–1898), American civil war soldier
- Daniel Tibbets (born 1969), American media executive
- Eliza Tibbets (1823–1898), California founder of the citrus industry
- Jane Tibbets: see List of Joseph Smith's wives
- Luther C. Tibbets (1820–1902), American merchant and farmer
- Paul Tibbets (1915–2007), United States Air Force general
- Paul W. Tibbets IV (born 1966), US Air Force general; grandson of Paul

== See also ==
- Tebbetts (surname)
- Tibbett
- Tibbetts
- Tibbs (surname)
