= Tebbetts =

Tebbetts may refer to:

- Tebbetts (surname)
- Tebbetts, Missouri
