= Tibbett =

Tibbett is an English-language surname from the common medieval given names Tebald or Tibalt. Notable people with the name include:

- Colin Tibbett (born 1951), English cricketer
- Lawrence Tibbett (1896–1960), American opera singer

== See also ==
- Tebbetts (surname)
- Tibbets
- Tibbetts
- Tibbs (surname)
