= Orcutt Ranch Horticulture Center =

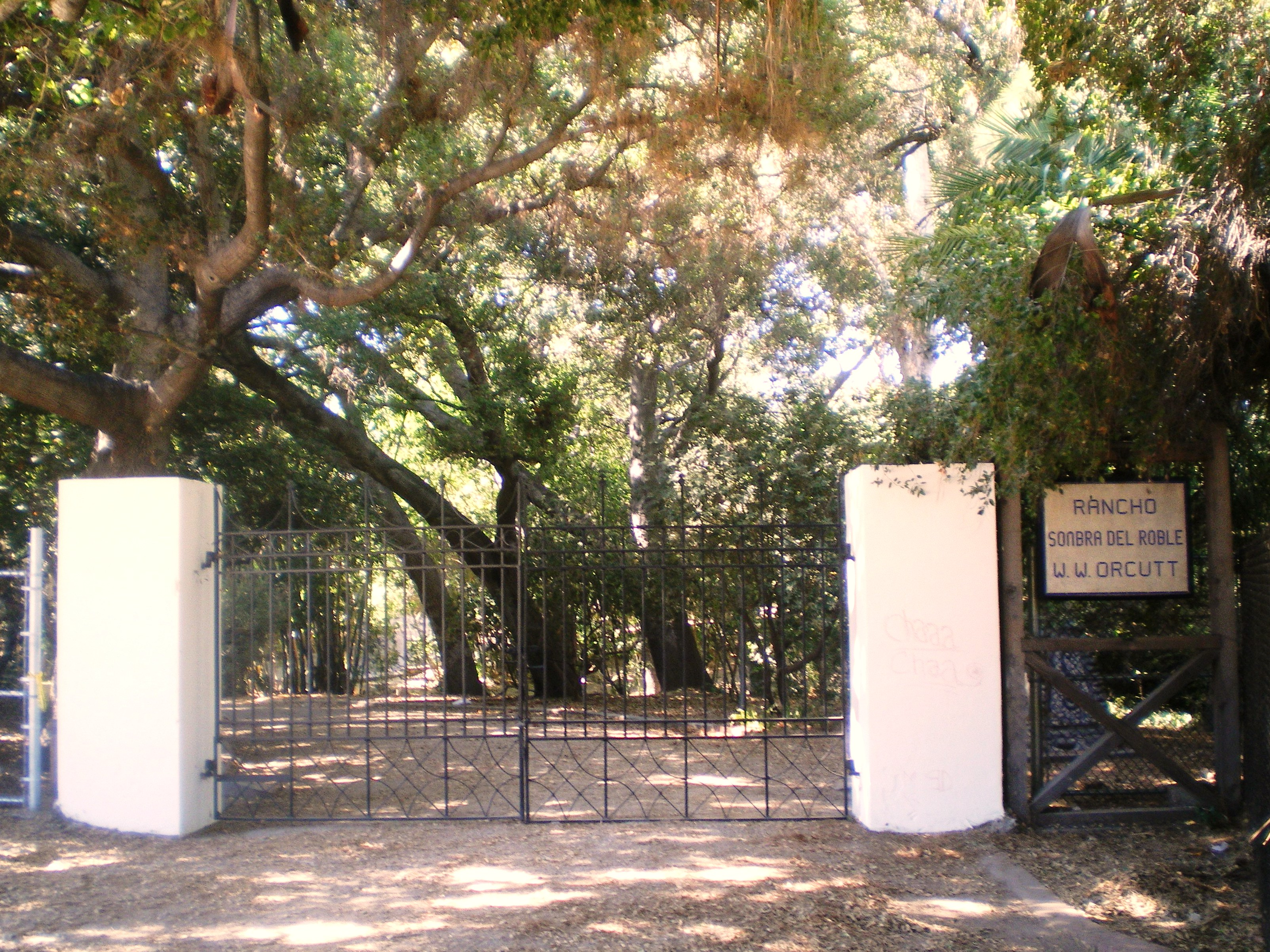
- Orcutt Ranch gate, September 2008

- Location within the Los Angeles metropolitan area
- 34°13′07″N 118°38′26″W
- Location: 23555 Justice Street, West Hills, Los Angeles, California, USA

History
- Built: 1903

Site notes
- Area: 210-acre (0.85 km^{2})
- Architectural style: Spanish Colonial Revival Style
- Governing body: City of Los Angeles Dept. of Recreation and Parks

Los Angeles Historic-Cultural Monument
- Designated: January 22, 1965
- Reference no.: 31

The Orcutt Ranch Horticulture Center, formally known as Rancho Sombra del Roble, is a Los Angeles Historic-Cultural Monument (HCM #31) located in the West Hills section of Los Angeles, California, USA.

== William Orcutt's vacation home ==
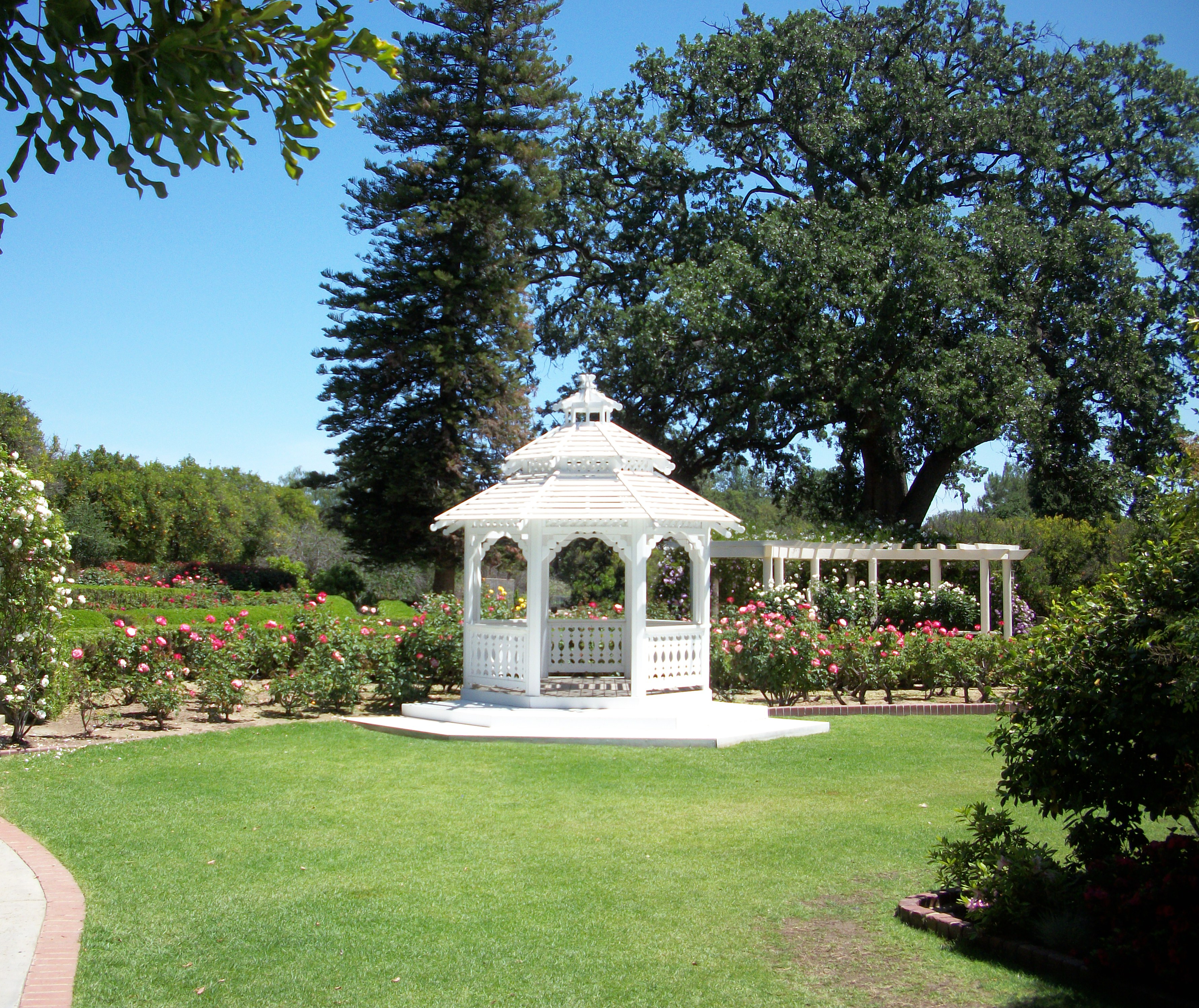
Gazebo in the main courtyard

Orcutt Ranch was the vacation and retirement estate of William Warren Orcutt, an early pioneer of oil production in California and the discoverer of one of the first prehistoric skeletons at the La Brea Tar Pits. The Rancho Sombra del Roble, Spanish for "Ranch of the Shaded Oak", was originally a 210-acre (0.85 km^{2}) cattle ranch and citrus orchard at the foot of the Simi Hills. Orcutt bought the property in 1917, and hired architect L.G. Knipe (who designed some of the original campus structures of Arizona State University) to design his home on the ranch. The 3,060-square-foot (284 m^{2}) residence, in the blend of Spanish Colonial Revival Style and Mission Revival Style architecture, was completed in approximately 1926. It features glazed tiles from Mexico and carved mahogany and walnut from the Philippines. Visitors are surprised to find that the design of the home prominently incorporates bas-relief Swastika architectural decoration. Mary Orcutt, William's wife, chose the symbol due to its connection with Native American traditions, and did so before the Nazis turned it into a symbol of anti-Semitism and genocide. President Herbert Hoover, who was a friend of the Orcutts, visited the ranch.

== Acquisition and operation by the City ==
A 24-acre (10 ha) portion of the original estate, including the residence, gardens, oaks and citrus orchard, was designated as a Historic-Cultural Monument in January 1965. Those 24 acres (10 ha) were purchased by the City of Los Angeles in 1966 for $400,000. The city-owned property includes a Spanish-style adobe residence, extensive gardens, oak trees hundreds of years old, Dayton Creek, nature trails, fruit orchards, rose gardens, community garden plots, picnic tables and a multitude of exotic trees, plants and shrubs. Some of the more unusual trees found at the ranch are Purple Lily Magnolias, Lady Palms (Raphis excelsus) native to Asia, Bunya Bunyas (Araucaria bidwillii) evergreen native to Australia with cones weighing up to 15 pounds (7 kg)), Cork Oaks (Quercus suber), and one of the many Coast Live Oaks (Quercus agrifolia) measuring 32 feet (10 m) in circumference, believed to be 700 years old. For 53 years (1927–1980), Ernest Cornejo was employed as the property's caretaker and gardener. Cornejo was hired at age 17 to plant and tend to the exotic trees and plants.

The Los Angeles Recreation and Parks Department operates Orcutt Ranch, which is available to be rented for special events. It is also opened up for popular public fruit picks.

== Gallery ==
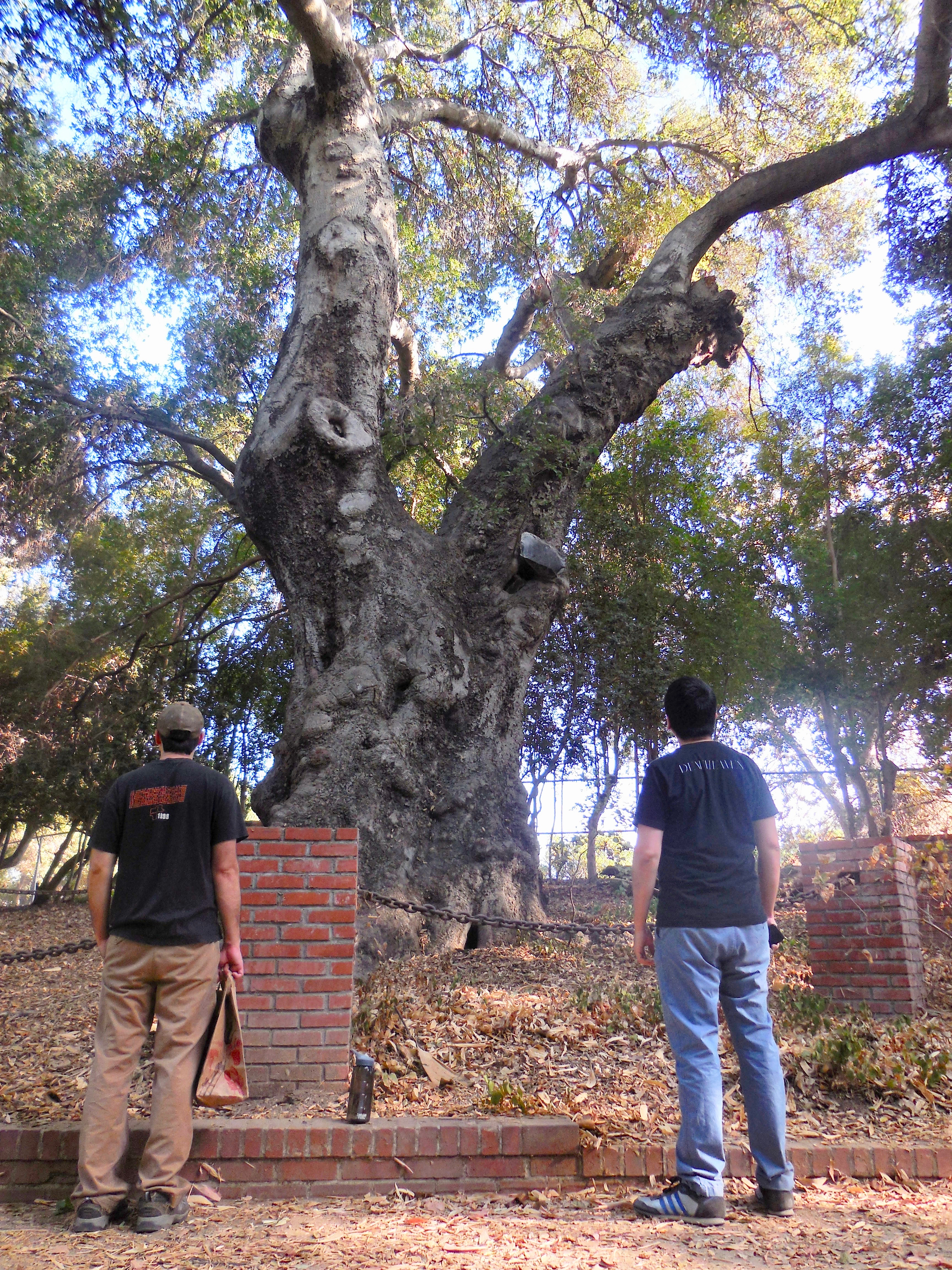
700+ year old tree at Orcutt Ranch

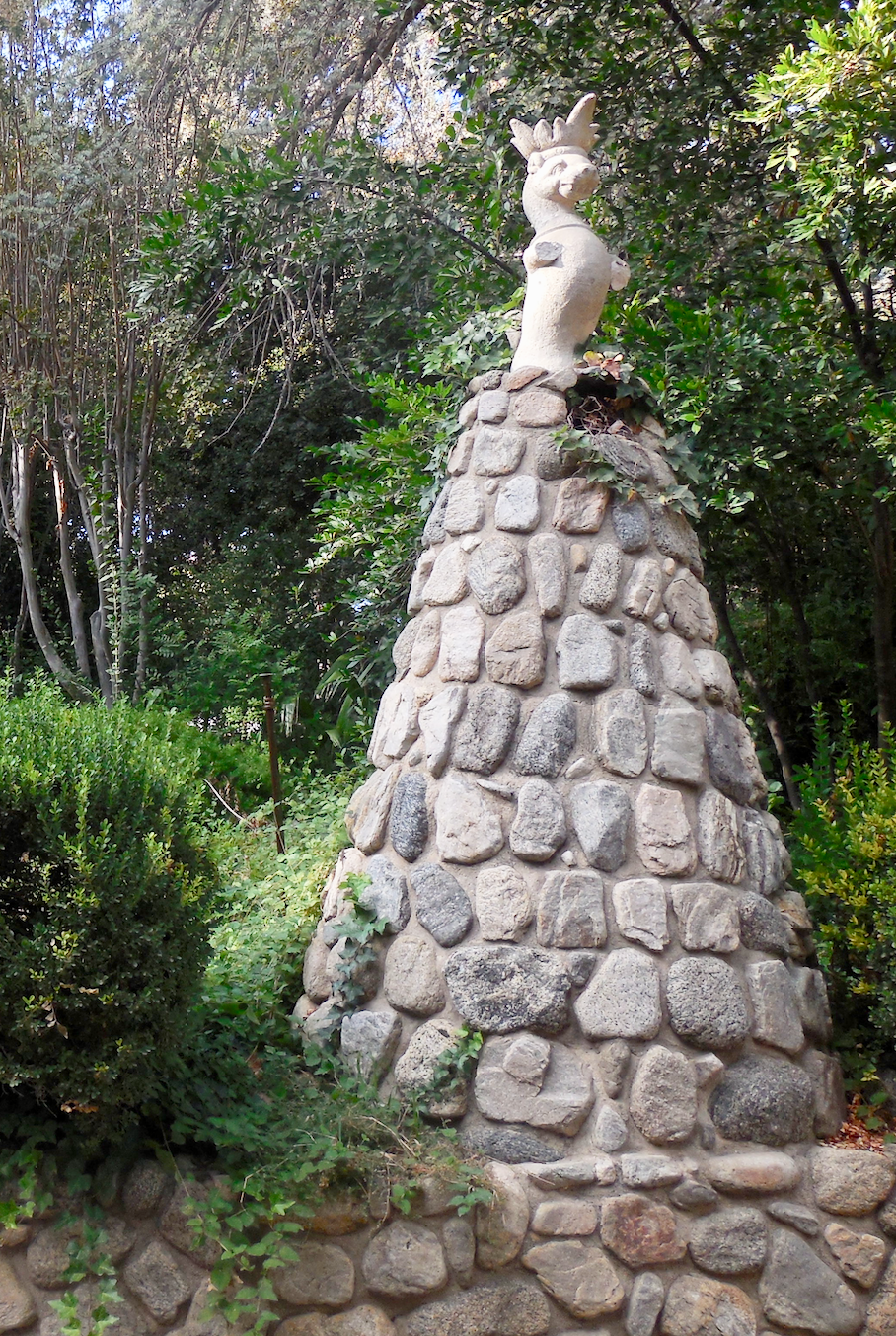
Artsy pylon at Orcutt's original driveway

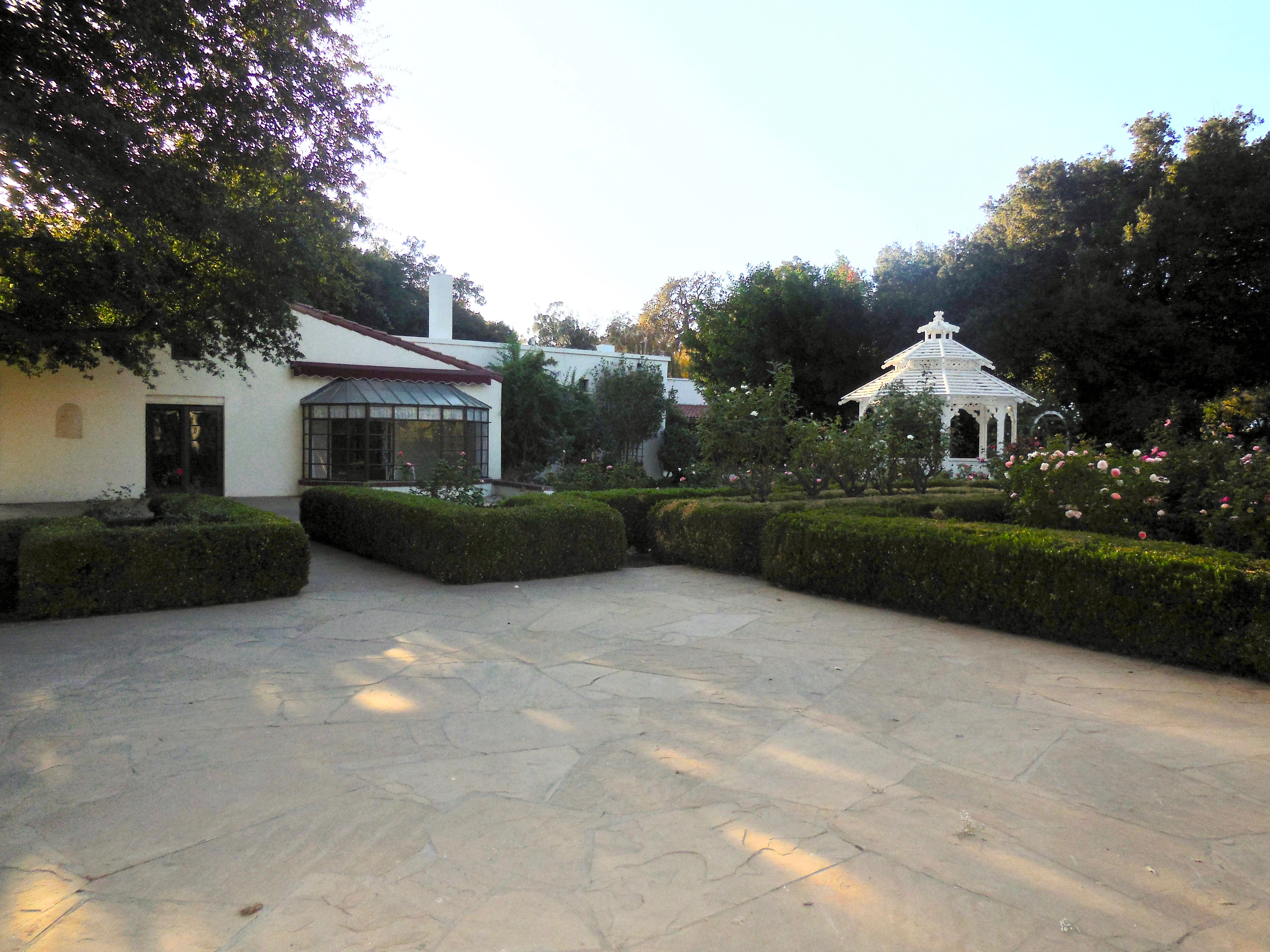
East face of the Orcutt house

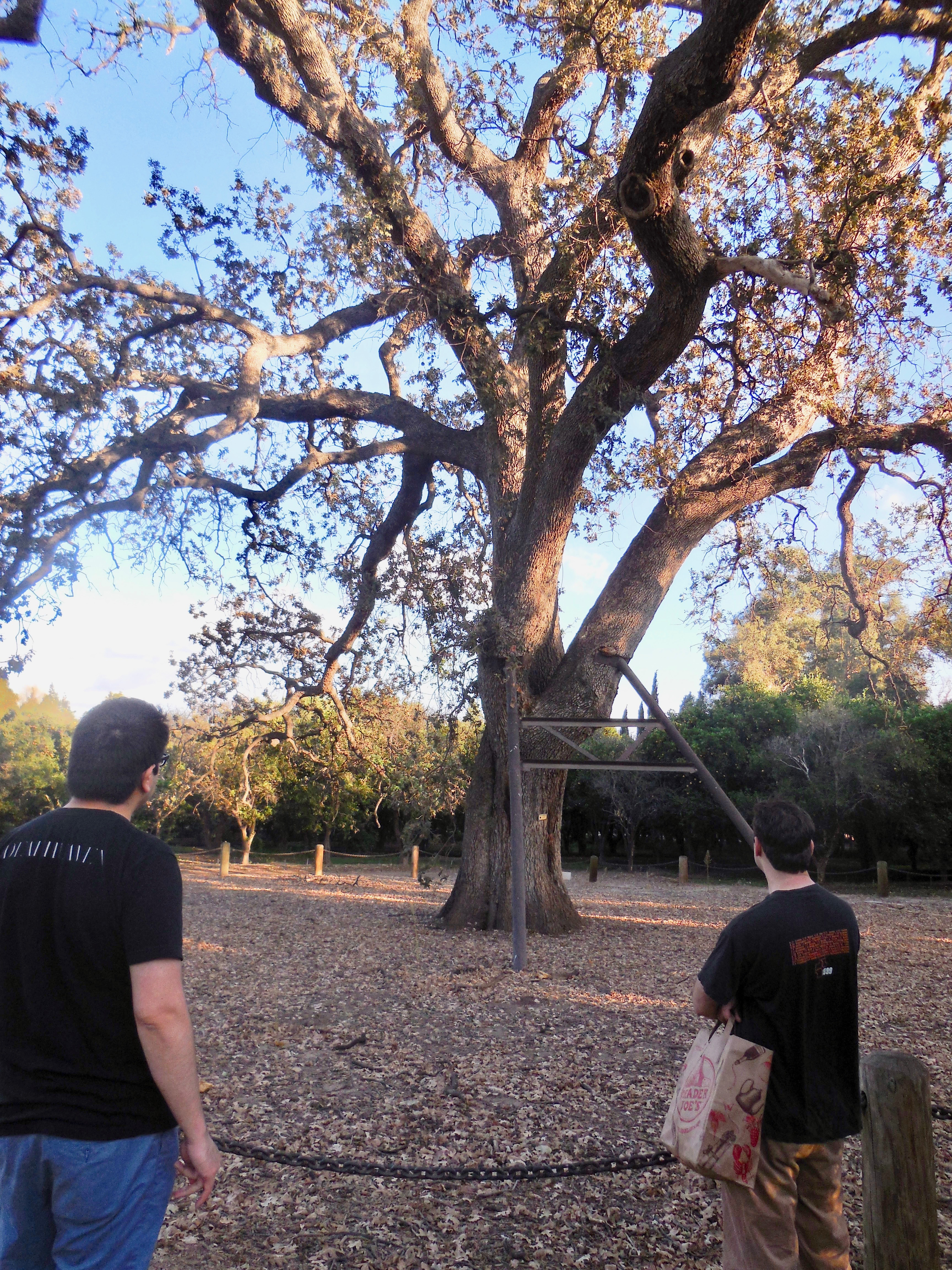
Old oak tree at the ranch

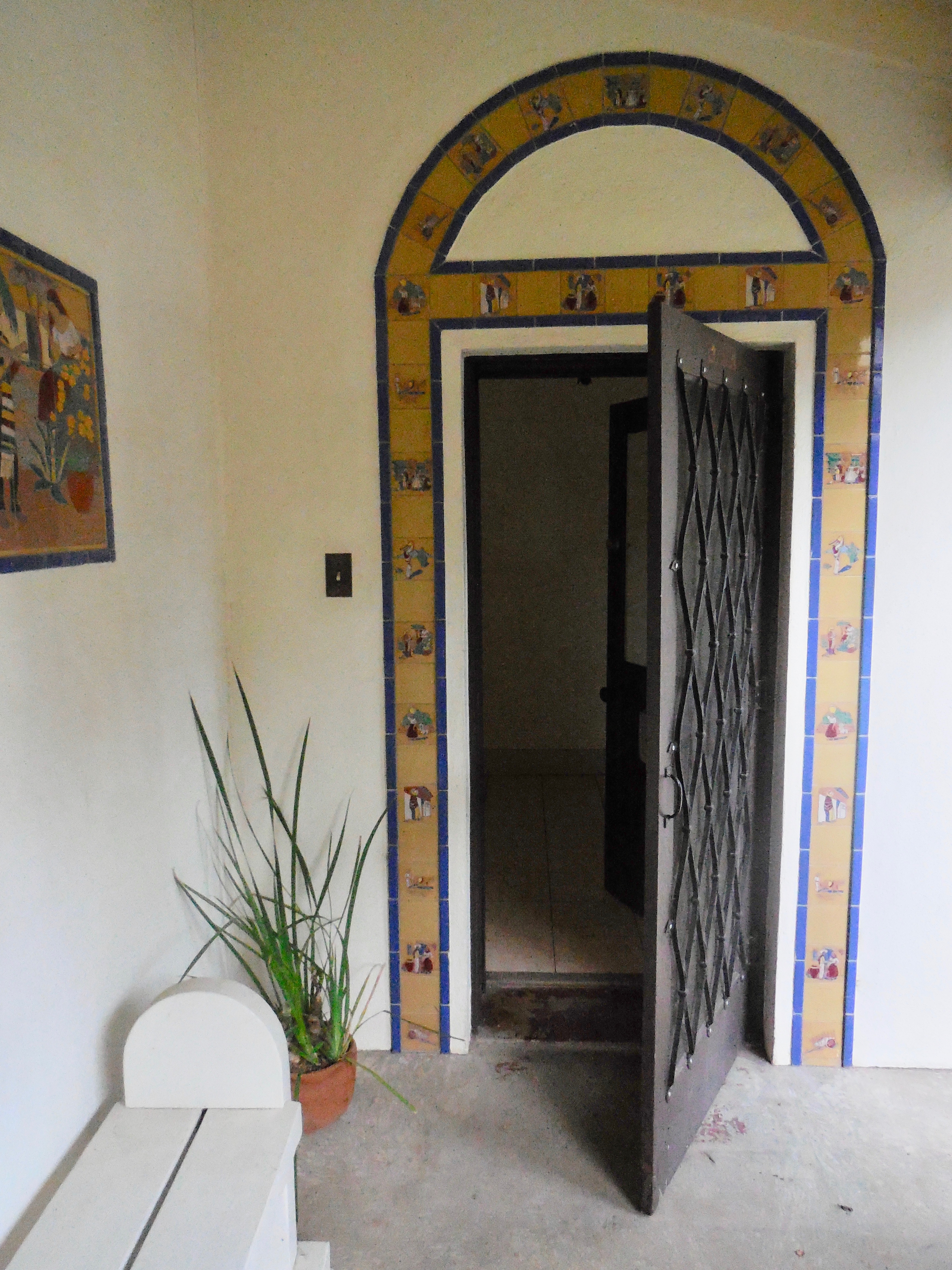
Tile doorway at the ranch

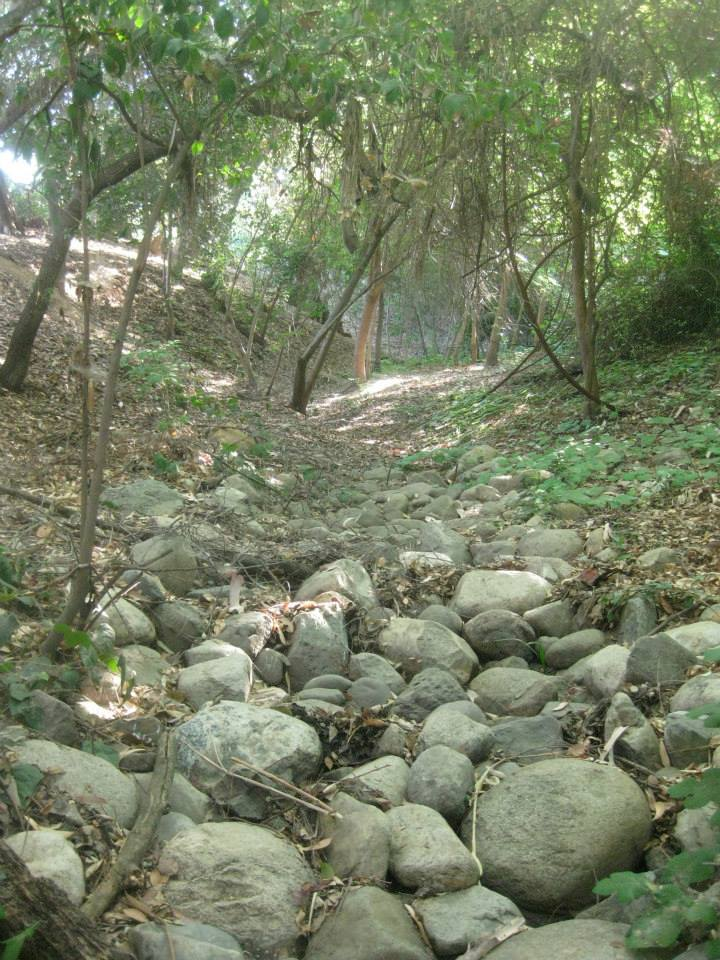
Dry creek bed at Orcutt Ranch

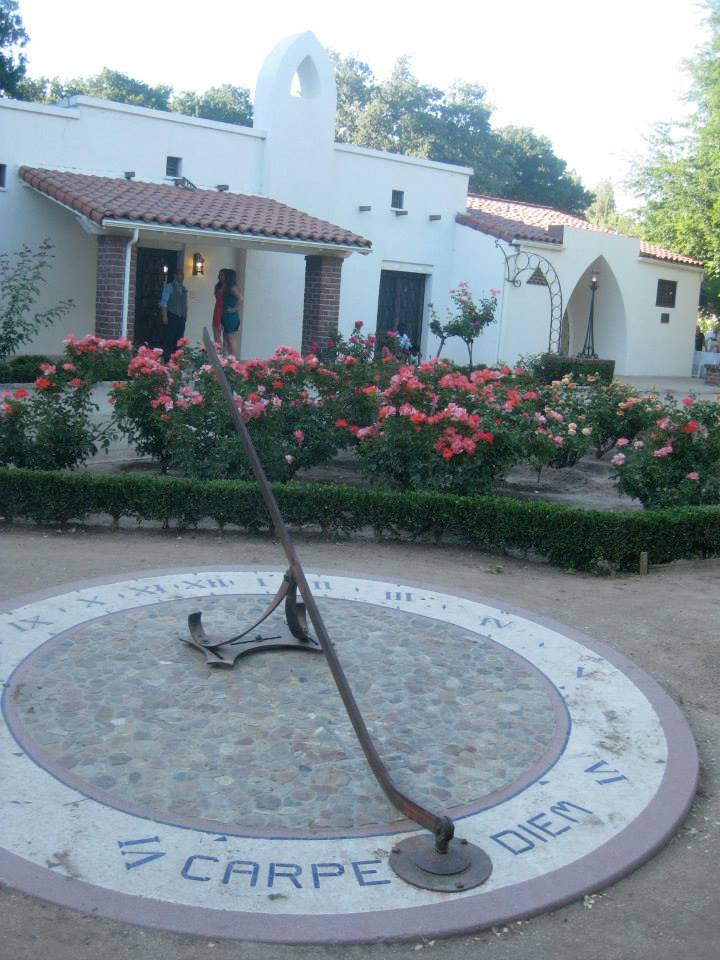
Sundial at the ranch next to a bed of roses

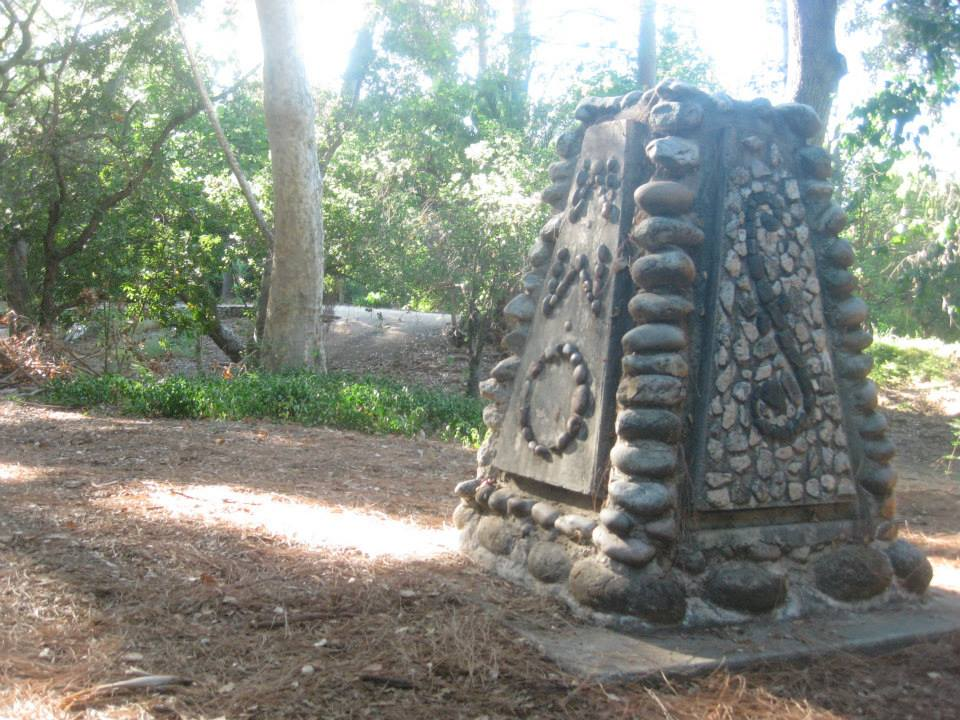
"WWO" for William Workman Orcutt

== See also ==
- Citrus
  - Orange (fruit)
  - Citrus production
  - California Citrus State Historic Park
  - Agricultural Museum (periodical)
- Mother Orange Tree
- Washington navel orange tree (Riverside, California)
- List of Los Angeles Historic-Cultural Monuments in the San Fernando Valley
  - List of Registered Historic Places in Los Angeles
- Mission Revival Style architecture
- Spanish Colonial Revival architecture
