= Washington navel orange tree (Riverside, California) =

Historic landmark in California

Parent Washington Navel Orange Tree
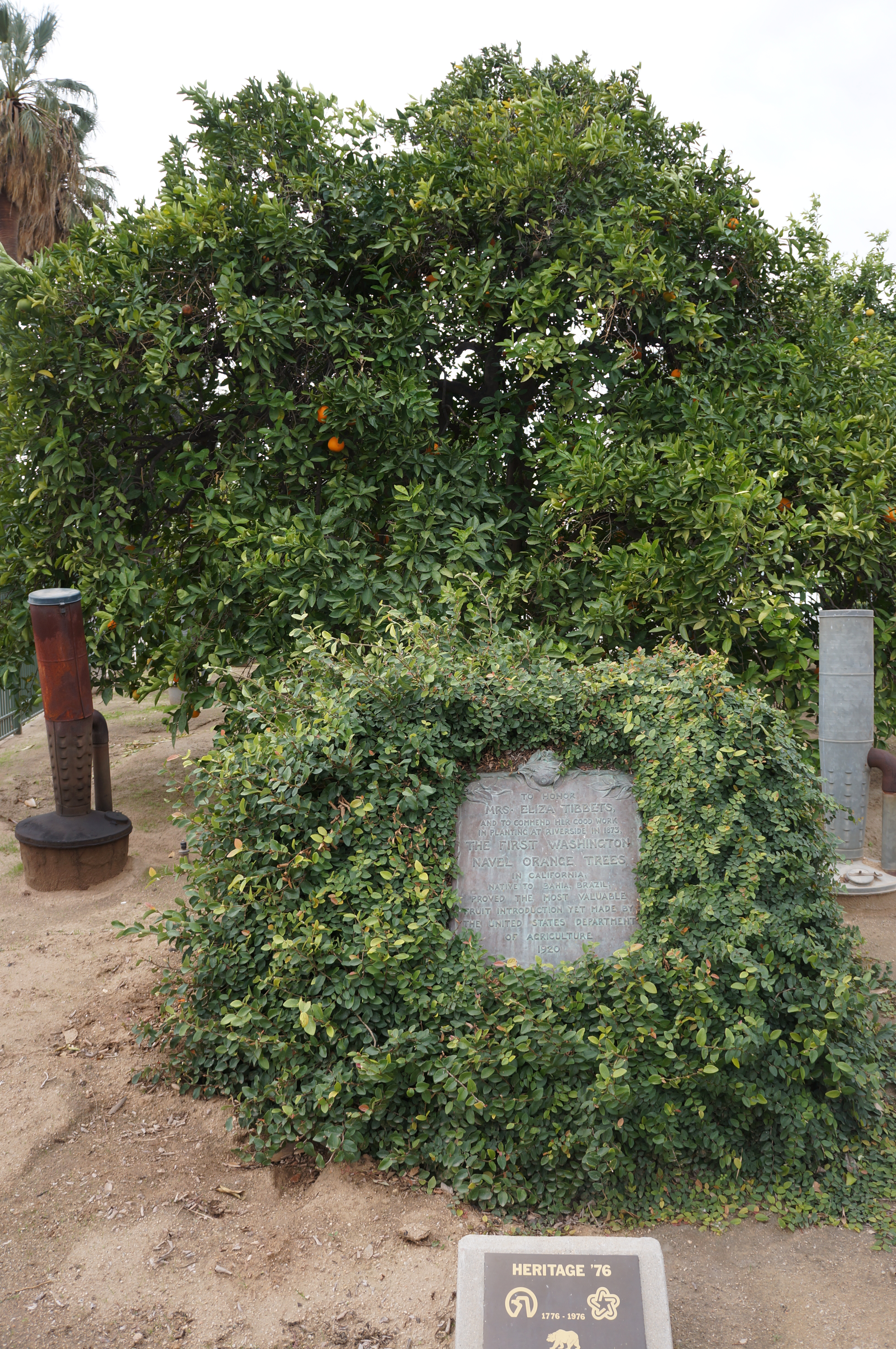
- Parent Washington Navel Orange Tree

- Location within California
- 33°56′46″N 117°24′06″W
- Location: Corner of Magnolia and Arlington Avenues, Riverside, California

History
- Built: 1873

California Historical Landmark
- Designated: June 1, 1932
- Reference no.: 20

The Parent Washington Navel Orange Tree is a tree grown by Eliza Tibbets in Riverside, California, in 1873. The Riverside County tree was designated a California Historic Landmark (No.20) on June 1, 1932, at the corner of Magnolia and Arlington Avenues, Riverside. The Bahia, Brazil, Washington navel orange was brought to the United States by the U.S. Department of Agriculture in 1870. The Department of Agriculture imported twelve trees; from these trees, some buds were grafted on to California sweet orange trees. The Washington Navel Orange is also called California Navel Orange.

The navel orange is a mutation of regular sweet orange. This mutated orange was discovered in a monastery orchard in Brazil in 1820. In 1870, a cutting from the navel orange was sent to Washington, D.C., thus was called the Washington navel orange. The name "navel orange" is from the mutation at the bottom blossom end of the orange. The bottom of the orange has a depression which looks like a human belly button. The mutation gives the navel orange no seeds. The Washington navel oranges were shipped all over the United States. As oranges cannot withstand freezing weather, the climate of Southern California is good for the Californian citrus industry and the navel orange.

In April 2018, a white cloth was draped over the tree to prevent it from being infected by citrus greening disease. The cloth was replaced with a 22' tall x 25' x 25' tent with an insect screen in June 2019. Maintenance is the joint responsibility of UC Riverside and the City of Riverside Parks Department. A 1940's era navel orange tree and grapefruit tree were also removed in April 2019 after they were found to not have significant historic value.

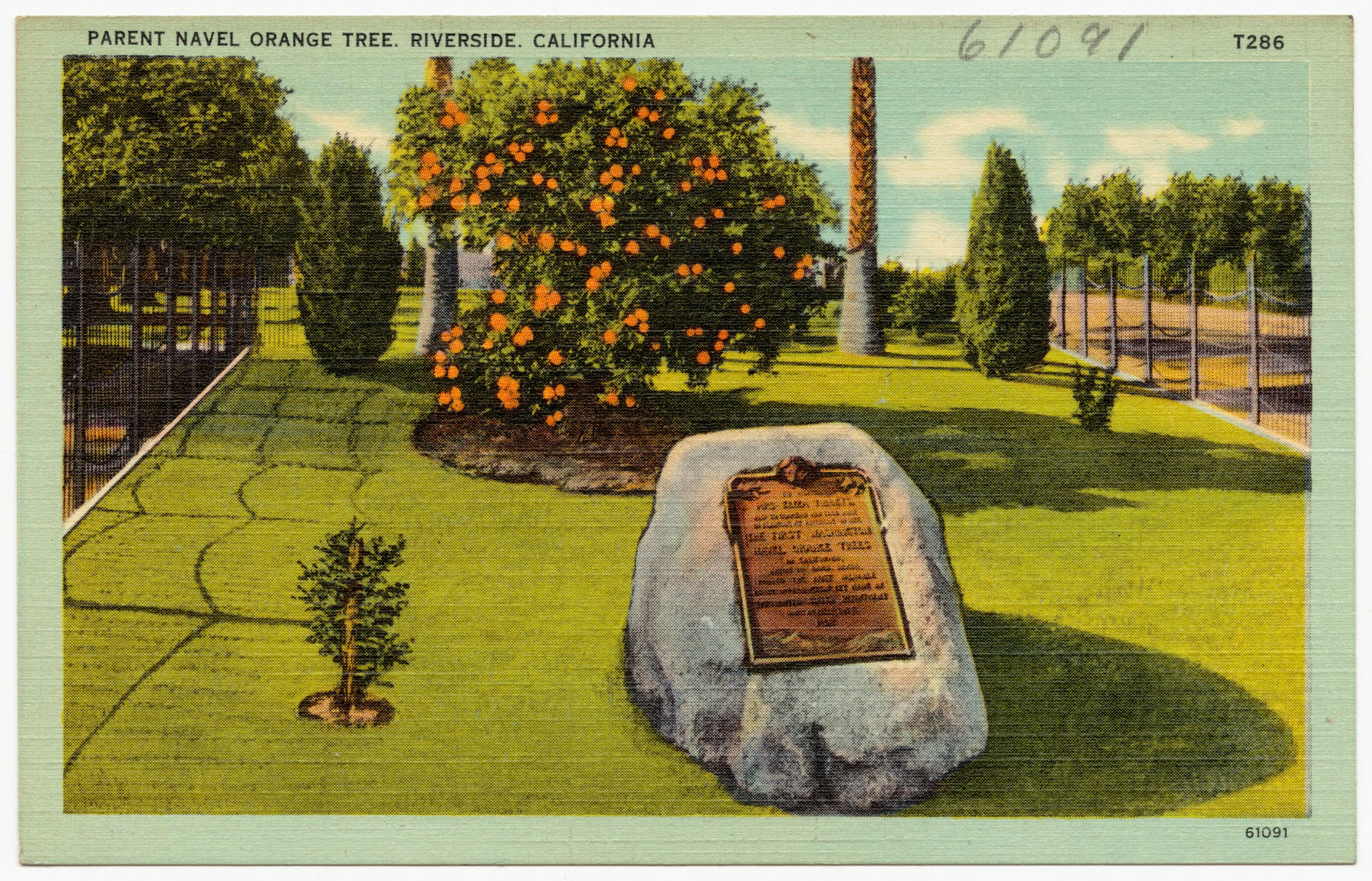
Tichnor Brothers photo postcard featuring the tree and historic marker

== Marker ==
A historical marker (see image), inscribed in 1920, on the Riverside, California site reads:

- To Honor Mrs. Eliza Tibbetts, and to commend her good work in planting the first Washington Navel Orange trees in California. Native to Bahia, Brazil, proved the most valuable fruit introduction yet made by the United States Department of Agriculture.

The California Historical Landmarks Guidebook's summary on this marker notes:

- NO. 20 PARENT WASHINGTON NAVEL ORANGE TREE – The tree was introduced into the United States from Bahia, Brazil, by the U.S. Department of Agriculture in 1870. Twelve young trees were received and buds from them were propagated on sweet orange seedlings. In 1873 two of these greenhouse-grown trees, which were distributed throughout the United States, were sent to Mrs. Eliza Tibbets in Riverside.

== See also ==
- California Citrus State Historic Park
- California Historical Landmarks in Riverside County, California
- Mother Orange Tree
- Orcutt Ranch Horticulture Center
