= Tibbs =

Tibbs is a surname, which may refer to:

- Tibbs (surname), includes a list of notable people with the surname

== Other uses ==
- "They Call Me Mister Tibbs!", a notable line from the 1967 American movie In the Heat of the Night
- They Call Me Mister Tibbs!, a 1970 American movie and sequel to the above
- TIBBS, a bulletin board system of the 1980s

== See also ==
- Tibs (disambiguation)
- Tibb's Eve, a regional holiday in Newfoundland, Canada
- Evans-Tibbs House, a historic residence in Washington, D.C.
