= TIB =

TIB (or Tib or TiB) may refer to:

== Computing ==
- Tebibit (Tib), a unit of information used to quantify computer memory or storage capacity
- Tebibyte (TiB), a unit of information used to quantify computer memory or storage capacity
- TIB (file format), a file format used by Acronis True Image software
- Win32 Thread Information Block, in Microsoft Windows programming

== Companies and organizations ==
- nl:Toetsingscommissie Inzet Bevoegdheden, the Dutch review board for the use of special powers by the security and intelligence services
- Danish Timber Industry and Construction Workers' Union (native name Forbundet Træ-Industri-Byg i Danmark)
- Technische Informationsbibliothek, the German National Library of Science and Technology
- Transparency International Bangladesh, an anti-corruption non-governmental organization
- TIB Financial Corporation, a bank holding company purchased by North American Financial Holdings
- TIB Development Bank, a development bank owned by the national government of Tanzania.

== Characters ==
- Tib from "Tib et Tatoum" (aka "Tib and Tumtum") comics/cartoon
- Tib-cat from The Little Broomstick

== Other uses ==
- River Tib, an underground river flowing through Greater Manchester
- Tib, Iran, a village in Markazi Province, Iran
- The Illustrated Bartsch, a compendium of European master prints
- Therapy Interfering Behavior, in cognitive therapy
- Transscandinavian Igneous Belt
