= Eliza Tibbets =

California founder of the citrus industry (1823–1898)

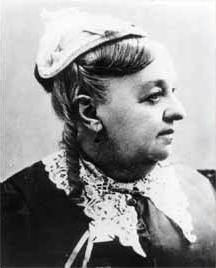
- Eliza Tibbets in Los Angeles
- Born: Eliza Maria Lovell; August 5, 1823; Cincinnati, Ohio, United States
- Died: 1898 (aged 74–75); Summerland, California, United States
- Occupations: Activist, horticulturalist
- Known for: Introducing hybrid Washington navel orange trees in California.

Eliza Tibbets (born Eliza Maria Lovell; 1823–1898) was among early American settlers and founders of Riverside, California; she was an activist in Washington, D.C., for progressive social causes, including freedmen's rights and universal suffrage before going to the West Coast. A spiritualist, she led seances in Riverside. She became known for successfully growing the first two hybrid Washington navel orange trees in California.

Married three times, she had a relationship with Luther C. Tibbets, living with him in Virginia and moving with him from Washington, D.C., to California in the early 1870s. They married there and lived by agriculture. Her success with the navel orange contributed to adoption by farmers of this variety of orange tree and rapid expansion of the citrus industry and the historic cultural landscape of orange groves in California.

== Early years ==
Born in Cincinnati on August 5, 1823, Eliza Maria Lovell was the youngest child of Oliver and Clarissa Downes Lovell. Pioneers to early Ohio, the Lovells had migrated to Cincinnati from Boston in 1812, traveling by covered wagon, then by river boat. The Lovell family became prominent in the frontier town. Eliza's father was elected to several positions; as a town councilman, city councilman, and President of the Fire Wardens' Association; he was called as a New Jerusalem minister, and selected as a trustee of the city water works, the Woodward School, and the Academy of Fine Arts.

Her maternal uncle "Commodore" John Downes was a well-known and highly decorated officer of the War with Tripoli and the War of 1812. He commanded the Mediterranean Squadron and later the Pacific Squadron. Downes’s ship USS Potomac became the first U.S. naval vessel to circumnavigate the globe.

The Lovells were members of the Swedenborgian Church of the New Jerusalem in Cincinnati; it was based on the writings of Swedish scientist and mystic, Emanuel Swedenborg. Their congregation included intelligent, cultured, and influential people who loved good literature, music, painting, the theater and other arts. Cincinnati church members included inventors Jacob, William & R. P. Resor, publisher Benjamin and sculptor Hiram Powers, clockmaker Luman Watson, artist Mary Menessier Beck, educators Alexander Kinmont, Frederic Eckstein, and M. M. Carll, and theatrical agent Sol Smith.

== Marriages and family ==
At age 18, Eliza Lovell married James Summons, a steam boat captain, in the Cincinnati Swedenborgian church. Their son James B. Summons was her only child to survive into adulthood.

Eliza Lovell Summons later became a spiritualist. When Spiritualism spread throughout the nation and the globe during the mid-19th century, her father Oliver Lovell became President of the spiritualist society in Cincinnati. Her sister Clara Lovell Smith's sealed letter was divined by spiritualist physician John Redmond, who discussed the family in one of his books. Tibbets was considered an accomplished medium.

Tibbets's second husband, James Neal, was a commerce merchant who became a well-known healing medium. Noted Spiritualist lecturer Thomas Gales Forster and his family lived with James and Eliza Lovell Neal in Clifton, Ohio, in 1860.

In 1861 the Neals moved to New York City with her father. There her son James Summons enlisted in the New York State infantry at 17 under the name James B. Lovell. He completed his three-year enlistment and was honorably discharged as the regimental postmaster.

=== Southern United States ===
After the war, Eliza Reveal became involved with merchant Luther C. Tibbets, who had been married twice before and had several children. He was an abolitionist. Her son James Summons married Luther's eldest daughter Harriet, and moved with their parents.

The Tibbets moved into the South in Tennessee but were driven out by unwelcoming locals who considered them carpetbaggers.

In 1867 the family moved to Fredericksburg, Virginia, and opened a local store. Luther campaigned for office as a Radical Republican. He also worked as a land agent and ran a Sabbath School for freedmen and their children at a black Baptist Church, as freedmen were eager for education.

Tibbets was working on a land development plan for what he proposed to be a 30,000-acre colony outside Fredericksburg. He intended to allow people of any race to buy property. When the Tibbets were driven from Fredericksburg, a freedwoman persuaded them to take her young daughter Nicey with them, as she believed other areas would be better for the girl. A 21st century account suggested that Nicey was the daughter of Eliza's son James and a young black woman in Virginia.

In Washington, D.C., Eliza and Luther Tibbets worked with Josephine S. Griffings, Congressman Benjamin F. Butler and other progressives on universal suffrage, freedmen's rights and other social issues.

Luther Tibbets left Washington in 1870 for California, where he settled in what became Riverside. She continued her activism, especially in the area of women's suffrage. Woman suffrage activists argued that the U.S. Constitution already enfranchised women citizens. For a brief time in the 1870s, citizens of the District of Columbia were enfranchised. DC woman suffrage activists argued that they were citizens and therefore enfranchised under that law.

In 1871 seventy women tested the law in Washington, D.C. They marched to the registrar's office to register to vote, but were rejected. Frederick Douglass had accompanied the group, which included Tibbets, Belva Lockwood, the first woman admitted to the Supreme Court Bar; educator Sara Spencer, Dr. Susan A. Edson, physician to President Garfield, pioneer Julia Archibald Holmes; author E. D. E. N. Southworth, and founder of the Freedmen's Bureau, Josephine S. Griffing.

At the election, they tried to vote but were rejected at the polls. Their test cases, Spencer v. Board of Registration, and Webster v. Judges of Election, were heard in the Supreme court of the District of Columbia. Women throughout the United States, including Susan B. Anthony and Virginia Minor demonstrated in this way, testing the law with civil disobedience. In the Minor v. Happersett decision of 1875, however, the Court formally dissociated citizenship from voting rights.

=== California ===
Eliza moved to California and was among pioneers in Riverside, where she lived first with her son and his wife Harriet, Luther Tibbets's eldest daughter. Among the pioneers in the 1870s were a group of "spiritualists and free thinkers." Eliza and Luther finally had a justice of the peace regularize their relationship.

Tibbets accomplished much in her years in Riverside and Southern California, including successfully cultivating two grafted navel orange trees. When their fruit appeared at agricultural fairs, it attracted immediate attention. The hybrid came to dominate agricultural citrus orchards, as described below.

Their fortunes rose and fell, and they went bankrupt in 1878. Continuing to work on their small property, they built up their lives again but were never wealthy.

Tibbets died in 1898 while visiting the spiritualist colony in Summerland, on the coast near Santa Barbara. She was buried at Riverside's Evergreen Cemetery.

== Legacy and honors ==
- A statue of Tibbets produced by artist Guy Angelo Wilson was dedicated on August 5, 2011, at the pedestrian mall beside the historic Mission Inn in Riverside. The Tibbets memorial is the first statue in Riverside to commemorate a woman.
- The California Citrus State Historic Park and the Orcutt Ranch Horticulture Center preserve the history of navel oranges in Riverside.

== Tibbets and the Washington navel orange ==
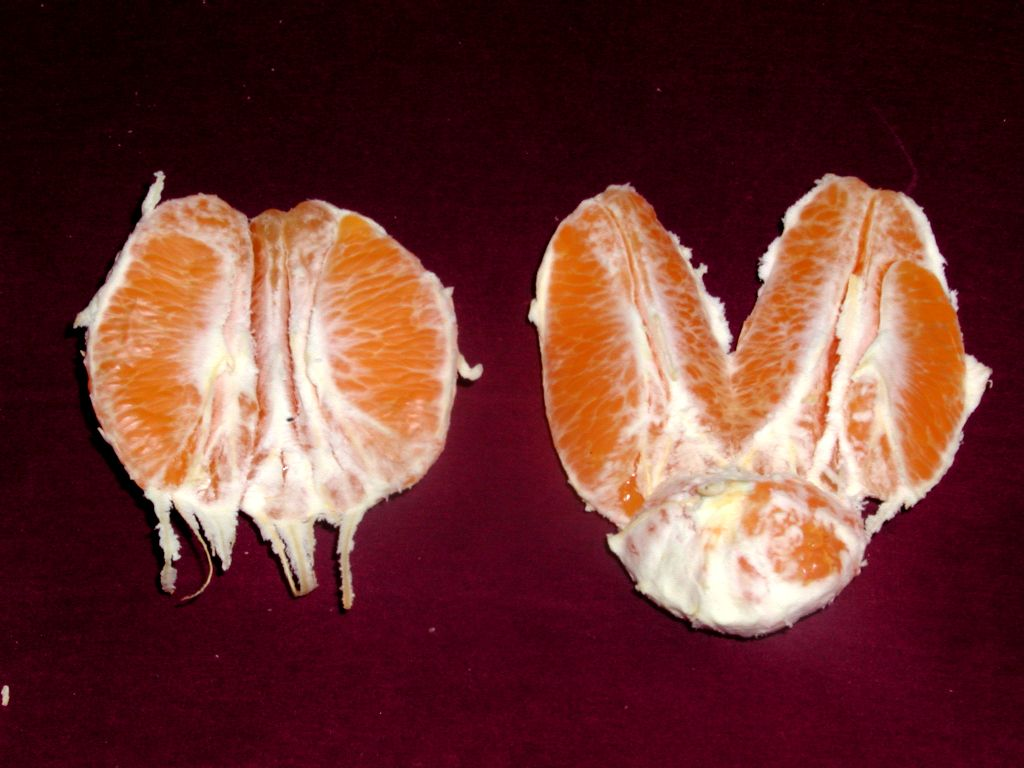
A Navel orange, also known as the Washington, Riverside, or Bahia navel.

=== Washington navel orange history ===
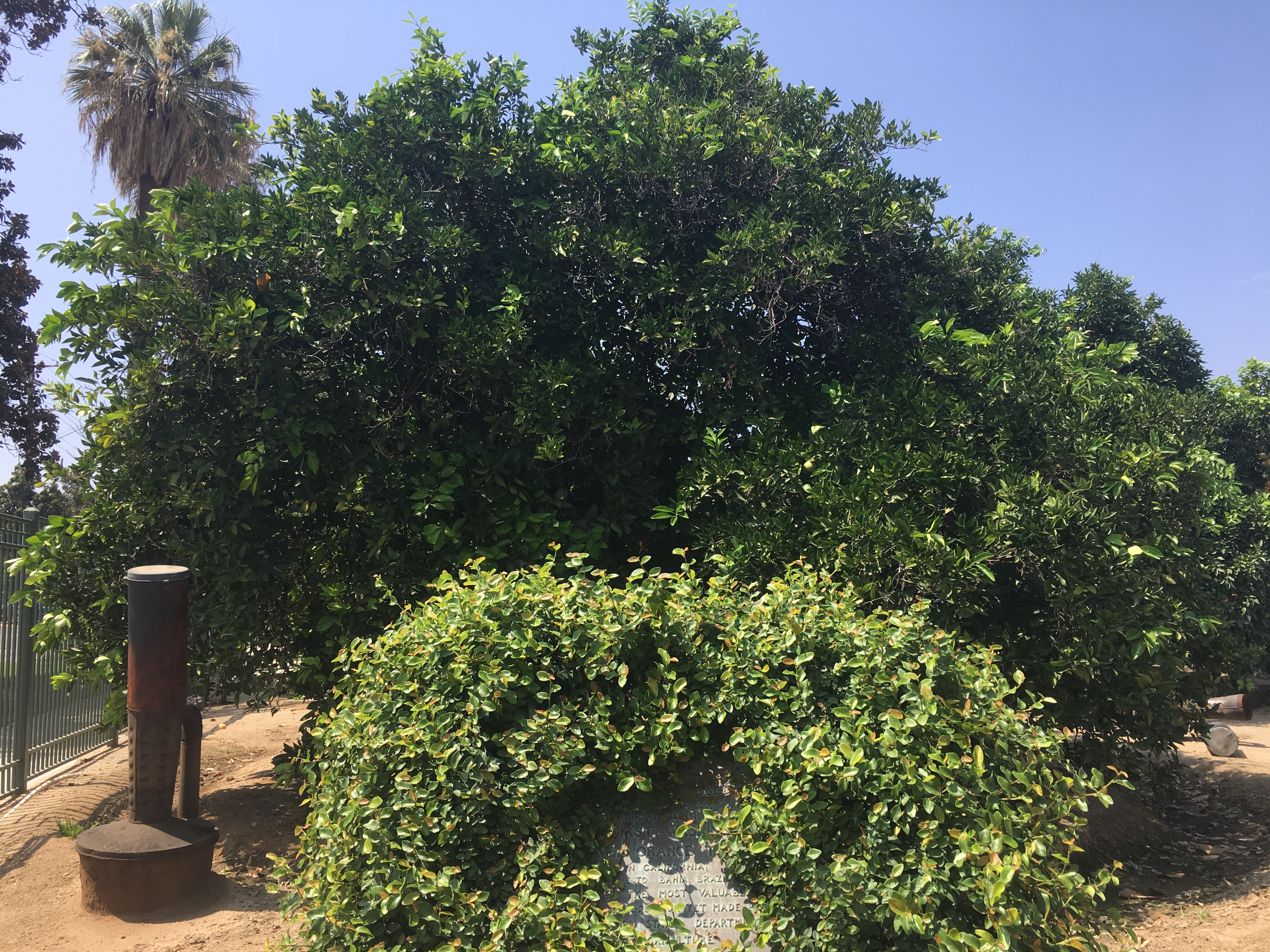
Parent Navel Orange Tree in Riverside, California (August, 2017)

The navel orange was not new when Tibbets introduced it to United States agriculture. A kind of navel was described and pictured by John Baptisti Ferrarius in 1646. Early Brazilian publications often referred to the Navel orange, or lavanja de ombigo. The Washington navel is sterile – truly seedless and utterly devoid of pollen with pistils deformed in a way that makes seed production from the pollen of other varieties impossible. Hence, the Washington navel orange is propagated by grafting a bud from an existing tree onto separate (genetically distinct) rootstock. The Washington Navel orange is particularly prone to a type of mutation in which one branch or "sport" differs genetically from the rest of the tree. It first appeared as a sport on a Selecta sweet orange tree in Bahia, Brazil. A desirable sport like this enables growers to avoid the complications of genetic segregation and recombination by spreading the species through asexual propagation. Although asexual propagation required a certain amount of effort and level of expertise, this sport was extensively propagated in the vicinity of Bahia. Nowadays many important fruit crops are propagated asexually, including oranges, grapes, avocados, bananas and apples. In fact, all commercial citrus trees are grafted onto rootstock selected for adaptation to the soil, resistance to disease, and influence on fruit quality.

=== California citrus industry ===
The citrus industry in California was underway before Tibbets cultivated the Washington navel orange. But there was no outstanding early and midseason variety of sweet orange generally adapted to the climate. Extant citrus was mostly seedling trees grown from seeds obtained locally or from the Spanish missions. Growers experimented, but there was a lack of standardization in quality.

Meanwhile, at his greenhouses in Washington DC, William Saunders experimented with imported plants for possible incorporation into American agriculture. He built an orange house on the department grounds around 1867. In 1871 he reported that he was trying to secure complete collections of citrus.

In 1869 the Commissioner of agriculture brought Saunders a letter from a woman in Bahia, Brazil, telling of a fabulous local orange. It took some time and perseverance, but by 1871 Saunders was able to obtain from Bahia twelve newly budded navel orange trees in fairly good condition. He had prepared a supply of young orange stocks into which he inserted and grafted buds from the new trees. Saunders recorded in his journal, referring to Tibbets, "That lady called here and was anxious to get some of these plants for her place, and I sent two of them by mail". When the grafted orange trees were ready, Saunders mailed the first two out to Tibbets.

==== Groves in California and beyond ====
Hundreds of Bahia orange trees were sent to Florida at this time, a major base of the citrus industry, but none flourished. Tibbets planted the two trees in her garden in 1873.

It is widely accepted that she cared for the two trees, using disposed dishwater as irrigation because the Tibbets lot was not connected to canal water. Agriculture officials attribute the success of the two trees that did flourish to Tibbets’s care.

The first fruits borne by these trees were produced in the season of 1875–76. When the Washington navel orange was publicly displayed at a fair in 1879, the valuable commercial characteristics of the fruit, including their quality, shape, size, color, texture, and lack of seeds, were immediately recognized. Tibbets’s orange was ideally suited to Riverside's semiarid weather; its thick skin enabled it to be packed and shipped. The contrast between this new fruit and that of seedling trees was so striking that most new grove plantings were rapidly converted to Washington navel oranges. Tibbets sold budwood from her trees to local nurserymen, which led to extensive plantings of nursery trees cloned from hers.

Tibbets’s success with the navel orange led to a rapid increase in citrus planting. and the citrus planted was predominantly the Washington navel orange. The commercial success of these early orchards soon led to a widespread interest in this variety, so that by 1900 it was the most extensively grown citrus fruit in California. Since then Washington navel orange budwood and trees have been taken from California across the seas to Japan, Australia, South Africa, and other tropical or semi-tropical districts.

Tibbets’s orange allowed agriculture in California to survive transition from wheat. Wheat had been the single most profitable crop statewide between 1870 and 1900 as California became one of the largest grain producers in the nation. Sometime about 1880, many agriculturalists in the central valley and Southern California began to convert to fruit. Soil and climate were obviously conducive to such a conversion. After the turn of the 20th century, wheat exports began a rapid decline in the face of intense Canadian and Russian competition, and declining grain yields due to soil depletion. Such lands were subdivided and used for horticulture. Agriculture provided a firm foundation for the state's economy.

== Legacy of introduction ==
The growth that the Washington navel orange produced in Riverside spread throughout the state, driving the state and even the national economy. Citrus assumed a major place in California's economy. By 1917 Washington navel orange culture was a $30 million per year industry in California. By 1933 the orange industry had grown to an annual income of $67 million. From one million boxes of oranges in 1887 to more than 65.5 million boxes of oranges, lemons, and grapefruit in 1944, despite the depression years of the 1930s, the California citrus industry experienced nothing short of explosive growth.

The success of Tibbets's orange trees inspired irrigation projects which converted more desert to orange groves. The size, scale, and ingenuity of the irrigation structures in Riverside and surrounding area are considered one of the agricultural marvels of the age. By 1893 Riverside was the wealthiest city per capita in the United States. Money poured into California. Tibbets’s orange led to an estimated $100 million of direct and indirect investment in citrus industry over the next 25 years. But Tibbets’s orange did not merely feed the wealth and growth of existing towns; new cities and towns popped up whose birth, existence, and future depended upon the condition of the orange market. In 1886 alone new citrus towns were laid out in Rialto, Fontana, Bloomington, Redlands, Terracina, Mound City (Loma Linda), and South Riverside, (Corona). Irrigated communities like Etiwanda, Redlands, Ontario and many others were launched.

The rapidly expanding citrus industry also stimulated the capital market for real estate. As the industry grew, land which had been regarded as worthless dramatically increased value. Not only did orange culture feed the land boom of the 1880s in Southern California; it allowed Riverside to survive when the land boom collapsed in 1888. (See also: Panic of 1893.) The success of Tibbets’s orange stimulated related industries. Citrus built the foundations of the region's economic modernization before the great flood of defense funds began in World War II. Tibbets’s introduction of the Washington navel orange was largely responsible for the fruit packing houses, inventions in boxing machines, fruit wraps and the iced railroad car.

By the mid-1880s five packing houses sprang up in Riverside. Many methods developed in the course of the growth of this industry, which had a wide application, to other fruit growing industries as well to citrus. The study and efforts of pioneers in the development of the California citrus industry led to the invention of orchard heaters and of many other methods of culture. In 1897–1898 Benjamin and Harrison Wright invented and patented a mechanized orange washer. By the end of 1898, two-thirds of Riverside's packinghouses were using the machines. At the turn of the century Stebler and Parker began manufacturing citrus packing machinery in Riverside independent of each other. The companies, which merged in 1922, became the California Iron Works, and later still Food Machinery Corporation (today's FMC Corp.). The Santa Fe Railroad opened a direct line to Riverside in 1886 allowing direct shipment to the east. Eight years later the first refrigerated rail cars shipped oranges from Riverside to the east on the Santa Fe Railroad.

Another illustration of the results of the success of the citrus industry in California was the organization of the growers into an exchange for the co-operative handling of their crop and its distribution. California Fruit Growers Exchange, a cooperative marketing association made up of local growers was founded in 1893; it is now known as Sunkist Growers, Incorporated.

=== Scientific approach to improvements ===
A key feature of the growth of the Washington Navel orange industry was a scientific approach to improvement. Study of propagation culture handling, transportation and other phases of producing distributing and marketing the crop was largely responsible for advancements used not only with citrus but also in other fruit industries. In 1893 cyanide gas was used to fight citrus scale. A U.S. Department of Agriculture scientist helped growers to harness nature's biological wrath during the "decay crisis" of 1905–1907, when alarming proportions of fruit spoiled in transit, and wed the industry to the scientific expertise of the USDA. Growers, scientists, and workers transformed the natural and social landscape of California, turning it into a factory for the production of millions of oranges. Orange growers in California developed the commercialized agriculture that only spread to the rest of the country a generation later. In 1906, the University of California established in Riverside its Citrus Experiment Station, the beginnings of the University of California, Riverside. Originally located on the slope of Mount Rubidoux, the station institutionalized the scientific expertise, support, and presence of the state's university and the federal government in the citrus industry, and brought quality control to the first link in the corporate agricultural chain. A field department was created which provided member growers with scientific and practical horticultural advice and direction that ultimately led to huge gains in productivity.

=== Conclusion ===
The progeny trees derived from this parent source tree continues to be the most popular navel grown in California. In the estimation of many, the fruit of the Washington navel remains the finest in size, flavor, quality, lack of seed, low rag and excellent holding capacity when the fruit is held on the tree. The navel orange remains as one of the most popular of all of the varieties of fresh fruit whether produced in California, Peru, South Africa, or Australia. Millions of trees were propagated from progeny of this mother tree, not only in California, but worldwide.

== See also ==
- Mother Orange Tree
- Washington navel orange tree (Riverside, California)
