= Tebbetts (surname) =

Tebbetts is an English-language patronymic surname, a variant spelling of Tibbetts, from the given names Tebald or Tibalt. Notable people with the name include:

- Birdie Tebbetts (1912–1999), American baseball player, coach, manager
- Chris Tebbetts, American writer
- George P. Tebbetts (1828–1909), 3rd Mayor of San Diego
- Jonas March Tebbetts (1820–1913), American lawyer and politician

== See also ==
- Tibbets
- Tibbett
- Tibbetts
- Tibbs (surname)
