= Tibbetts =

Tibbetts is an English-language patronymic surname from the given names Tebald or Tibalt. Notable people with the name include:

- Barry-Dre Tibbetts (born 2002), Cayman Islands footballer
- Billy Tibbetts (born 1974), American ice hockey player
- George W. Tibbetts (1845–1924), American businessman
- John C. Tibbetts (born 1946), American film critic and film historian
- Kurt Tibbetts (born 1954), Caymanian politician
- Margaret Joy Tibbetts, American diplomat
- Mollie Tibbetts (1998–2018), American murder victim
- Nate Tibbetts (born 1977), American basketball coach
- Philip Tibbetts, British officer of arms and vexillologist
- Steve Tibbetts (born 1954), American guitarist and composer
- Tammy Tibbetts (born c. 1985), American non-profit organization founder
- Willard Tibbetts (1903–1992), American long-distance runner

== See also ==
- Tebbetts (surname)
- Tibbets
- Tibbett
- Tibbs (surname)
