= Philip Tibbs =

Irish priest (fl. 1859–1907)

Philip Graydon Tibbs was a Church of Ireland priest in Ireland during the second half of the nineteenth century and the first decade of the 20th.

Tibbs was educated at Trinity College, Dublin. He was ordained deacon in 1859 and priest in 1860. He served curacies at Roscrea, County Tipperary and Birr, County Offaly. Tibbs was the incumbent at Creagh from 1876 to 1897. He was Provost of Kilmacduagh from 1888 to 1897; and Dean of Clonfert from 1897 to 1907.

His son, also Philip Graydon Tibbs, was an Anglican priest, serving in Ireland, India and the Middle East.
