= Therapy interfering behavior =

Therapy interfering behaviors or "TIBs" are, according to dialectical behavior therapy (DBT), things that get in the way of therapy. These are behaviors of either the patient or the therapist. More obvious examples include being late to sessions, not completing homework, cancelling sessions, and frequently contacting the therapist out-of-session. More subtle examples can include sobbing uncontrollably, venting, criticizing the therapist, threatening to quit therapy, shutting down, yelling, only reporting negative information, saying "I don't know" repeatedly, and pushing the therapist's limits. Behaviors that "burn out the therapist" are included, and thus, vary from therapist to therapist. These behaviors can occur in session, group, between sessions, and on the phone.

DBT requires therapists to directly address TIBs as a way to prevent early termination from therapy, to improve the relationship between therapist and client, and to model effective communication. TIBs are the second most important dysfunctional behavior to address according to DBT, just below life-threatening behaviors.

DBT is one of the first therapy models to identify problems between therapist and client in terms of behaviors rather than personality defects. Identifying TIB's to decrease (and identifying therapy enhancing behaviors) takes the place of the terms "transference" and "countertransference".

== Books ==
- Skills Training Manual for Treating Borderline Personality Disorder by Marsha M. Linehan ISBN 0-89862-034-1
- Cognitive Behavioral Treatment of Borderline Personality Disorder by Marsha M. Linehan, 1993

== See also ==
- Therapeutic relationship
- Psychological resistance
- Negative therapeutic reaction
