= Citrus production =

Cultivation or planting of citrus fruits

Major citrus growing regions

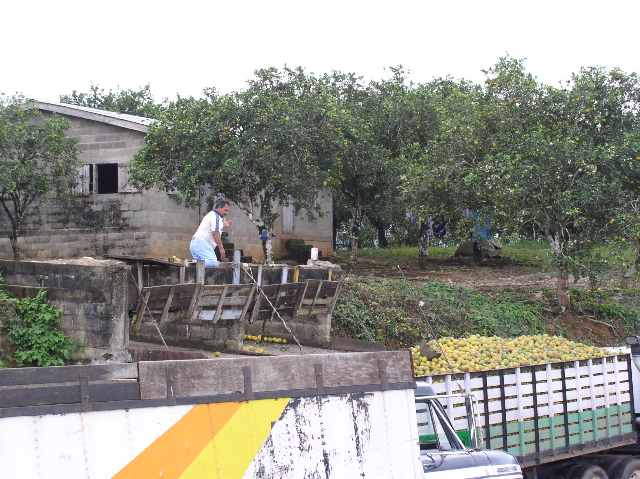
Gathering oranges in Cayo, Belize

Citrus production encompasses the production of citrus fruit, which are the highest-value fruit crop in terms of international trade. There are two main markets for citrus fruit:

- The fresh fruit market
- The processed citrus fruits market (mainly orange juice)

Oranges account for the majority of citrus production but the industry also sees significant quantities of grapefruits, pomeloes, lemons, and limes.

== History ==
While the origin of citrus fruits cannot be precisely identified, researchers believe they began to appear in Southeast Asia at least 4,000 BC. From there, they slowly spread to northern Africa, mainly through migration and trade. During the period of the Roman Empire, demand by higher-ranking members of society, along with increased trade, allowed the fruits to spread to southern Europe. Citrus fruits spread throughout Europe during the Middle Ages, and were then brought to the Americas by Spanish explorers. Worldwide trade in citrus fruits did not appear until the 20th century, and trade in orange juice developed as late as 1940.

== Volume ==
According to the UN Food and Agriculture Organization, world production of all citrus fruits in 2020 was 144 million metric tons (159 million short tons), with about half of this production as oranges. In the international fruit trade, citrus is the largest in terms of financial value. According to the United Nations Conference on Trade and Development (UNCTAD), citrus production grew during the early 21st century mainly by the increase in cultivation areas, improvements in transportation and packaging, rising incomes and consumer preference for healthful foods. In 2019–20, world production of oranges was estimated to be 76 million metric tons (84 million short tons), led by Brazil, China, India, EU, USA, Mexico, Egypt as the largest producers.

== Countries involved ==
Citrus fruits are produced all over the world; according to the FAO, as of 2016, about 79% of the world's total citrus production was grown in the Northern Hemisphere, with countries of the Mediterranean Basin contributing the largest volumes, while Brazil was the largest citrus producer in the Southern Hemisphere and the world.

In the United States, most orange juice and grapefruit is produced in Florida, while citrus fruits for consumption as fresh fruit are grown mainly in California, Arizona, and Texas. Smaller markets for citrus growth in the United States originate in South Carolina, Georgia, Oklahoma, Tennessee, and the gulf coastal states, including Louisiana, Alabama, Mississippi, and Georgia, as well as North Carolina. Independent cultivars are found in Kentucky, Virginia, and even Missouri, Southern Illinois, and far Southern Kansas. The farther north the range, the more seasonal the cultivation. Florida produces approximately 100 million boxes annually (each box is 90 lbs).

China could be a major player in the orange juice and processed citrus markets, except for high tariffs on citrus that make domestic sale more profitable. Though citrus originated in southeast Asia, current citrus production is low due to lower-than-average yields, high production and marketing costs, and disease.

Top ten total citrus fruits producers 2007 (tonnes) World's top producer in each category is given in grey.
Country	Grapefruit	Lemons and limes	Oranges	Tangerines, etc.	Other	Total
Brazil	72,000	1,060,000	18,279,309	1,271,000	-	20,682,309
China	547,000	745,100	2,865,000	14,152,000	1,308,000	19,617,100
United States	1,580,000	722,000	7,357,000	328,000	30,000	10,017,000
Mexico	390,000	1,880,000	4,160,000	355,000	66,000	6,851,000
India	178,000	2,060,000	3,900,000	-	148,000	6,286,000
Spain	35,000	880,000	2,691,400	2,080,700	16,500	5,703,600
Iran	54,000	615,000	2,300,000	702,000	68,000	3,739,000
Italy	7,000	546,584	2,293,466	702,732	30,000	3,579,782
Nigeria	-	-	-	-	3,325,000	3,325,000
Turkey	181,923	706,652	1,472,454	738,786	2,599	3,102,414
World	5,061,023	13,032,388	63,906,064	26,513,986	7,137,084	115,650,545
Source: Food And Agricultural Organization of United Nations: Economic And Social Department: The Statistical Division

== Oranges and orange juice ==
About a third of citrus fruit production goes for processing: more than 80% of this is for orange juice production. Demand for fresh and processed oranges continues to rise in excess of production, especially in developed countries.

The two main juice producers are Florida in the United States and the state of São Paulo in Brazil. Production of orange juice between these two makes up roughly 85% of the world market. Brazil exports 99 percent of its production, while 90 percent of Florida's production is consumed in the United States.

Orange juice is traded internationally in the form of frozen concentrated orange juice to reduce the volume used, so that storage and transportation costs are lower.

== Citrus canker ==
Citrus production is often cut short in many areas by outbreaks of bacteria known as Xanthomonas axonopodis, or citrus canker, which cause unsightly lesions on all parts of the plant, affecting tree vitality and early drop of fruit. While not harmful to human consumption, the fruit becomes too unsightly to be sold, and entire orchards are often destroyed to protect the outbreak from spreading.

Citrus canker affects all varieties of citrus trees, and recent outbreaks in Australia, Brazil, and the United States have slowed citrus production in parts of those countries. Citrus leafminer moths are a major concern where citrus canker exists. The openings created by citrus leafminer make the tree highly susceptible to the X. axonopodis bacteria which leads to citrus canker.

== Citrus greening disease in Florida ==
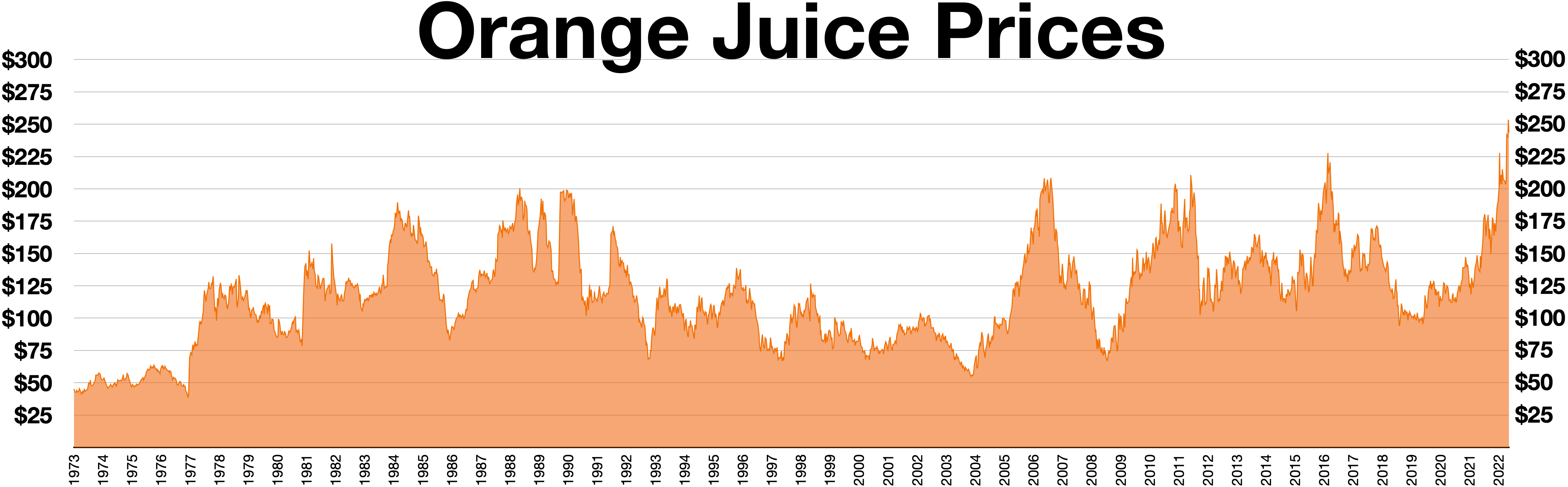
Orange juice prices 1973 – 2022 Citrus greening was first found in 1998 in the US and has cut the Orange tree production in half

=== Introductory and effects of disease ===
Huanglongbing (HLB), called citrus greening within the industry, is recognized as the deadliest citrus disease the Florida citrus industry has ever faced. This can be attributed to the economic costs of implementing new care-taking strategies, and overall tree loss creating a loss of revenues. A look at total Florida citrus-growing acreage provides a tangible impression to the hardships citrus greening provides; in 2000 there was 665,529 commercially producing citrus acres, while in 2011 there were 473,086 commercially producing citrus acres in Florida. Every year citrus reports indicate a continued loss of citrus production. Citrus greening is being attributed for a total output impact of −4.51 billion, and a loss of 8,257 jobs within Florida. The disease has now spread throughout the entire state, and affects every Florida citrus grower. The disease is spread through an insect vector, the Asian citrus psyllid. The psyllid was previously introduced into Florida in 1998. Prior to 1998 citrus greening was unknown in the state, thus the psyllids spread was left unchecked. By the time citrus greening had reached Florida psyllid populations were well established throughout the state of Florida. The first positive case of greening disease was in August 2005, when a greening positive citrus tree was discovered in Miami-Dade County. It was at this time the entire Florida citrus industry changed its citriculture practices overnight. Intensive pesticide applications, aggressive removal of citrus greening positive trees, and the complete switch from outdoor to indoor citrus nursery operations transpired.

=== Symptoms ===
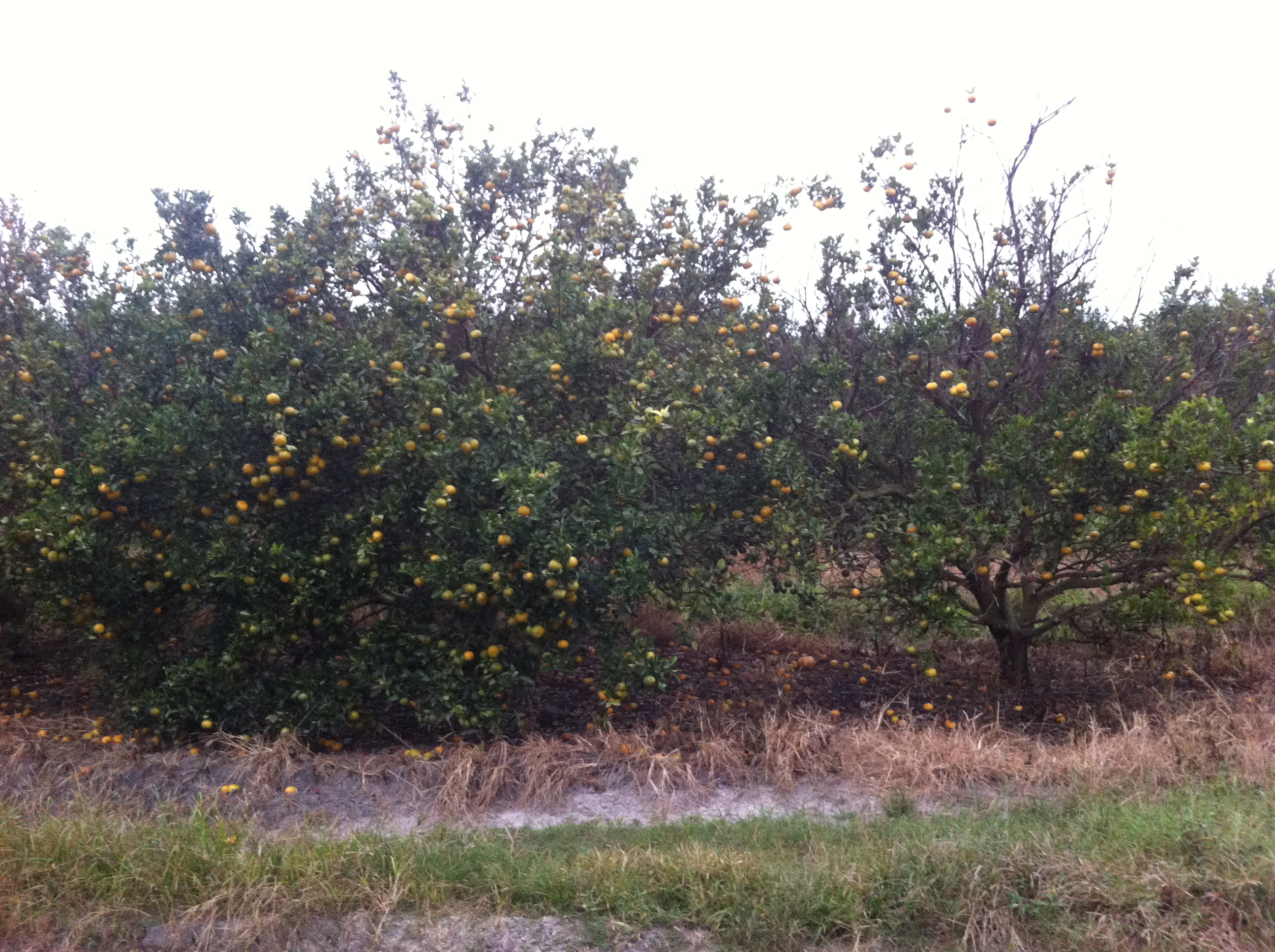
Negative citrus greening tree vs positive citrus greening tree

Symptoms of citrus greening are numerous, and can be varied in citrus trees. A tree will develop yellow shoots instead of the expected deep green colors. The disease presents itself on the leaves by giving an asymmetrical blotchy-mottle appearance. This is the key diagnosing characteristic of citrus greening. On affected limbs, fruit tend to be lopsided. The fruit will also never ripen and have a sour taste, making them unmarketable for both juice and fresh fruit productions. In later stages of infection the tree will suffer from heavy leaf drop, high percentages of fruit drop, and deep twig die back. A greening positive citrus tree's canopies will be airy due to the defoliation the disease causes. After a tree becomes infected with citrus greening it becomes uneconomical and may die within 2–5 years.

=== Ecology of spread ===
Vector control of citrus greening began when the disease was first introduced in 2005. All commercial citrus growers are advised in applying two dormancy pesticide sprays. These broad-spectrum pesticide sprays are applied in winter when adult psyllid populations decline to almost exclusive overwintering adults. With this strategy, significant reductions of populations withhold for up to 6 months. This fact is crucial as it protects the spring flush, which accounts for over 70% of new leaves for the year, from the infectious psyllid attacks. The spring flush typically occurs 3 months past winter. More aggressive citrus grove care-takers may employ a wide host of pesticides to try to keep psyllid populations low year round. These growers may spray pesticides up to seven times a year rotating various pesticides to employ different modes of actions against the psyllid. This is done in an attempt to prevent resistances of psyllids to the various pesticides. The spraying of pesticides is the only method of control for the citrus greening vector, the psyllid. It is impossible to kill all psyllids through pesticides; thus, strategic timing of pesticide sprays is done to try to slow the gradual spread of HLB throughout the citrus grove. Unfortunately, at this time it is inevitable that a commercial citrus grove will reach 100 percent infection rates even with aggressive sprays.

=== New care-taking strategies ===
Productivity of a citrus groves can be retained at pre-Huanglongbing levels through a three pronged strategy. Current research is aimed at the goal of giving the greatest yields for the lowest costs. Indeed, these lower costs are necessitated by the increased per acre cost of caretaking brought upon by Huanglongbing infection. Huanglongbing forces the commercial citrus caretaker to spray his/her block of citrus many more times a year than normal, considerably increasing costs. Per pound prices of citrus must continue increasing for citrus to remain profitable due to disease pressure.

Foliar fertilizers are now being sprayed on citrus trees at considerably higher rates than before citrus greening disease. Inspiration for the mixture of foliar nutrients was drawn from a local citrus grower, Maury Boyd. Mr. Boyd was the first to try a strategy of not removing greening positive citrus trees, and instead attempt aggressive nutritional sprays. His grove was as a result the first to remain economical with a high percentage rate of greening disease infection. His spray program is under considerable research by the University of Florida’s IFAS department. Further research is still needed, and being carried out to determine which specific fertilizer compounds, and the quantities used are the most efficient. Soil applied fertilizers appear to hold promise as well. In two-year studies carried out by the University of Florida’s IFAS department a combination of sulfur, zinc, manganese, iron and boron applied three times a year to the base of the tree are promising. The third year of research should be available in 2019.

Vector control of the psyllid, which is the sole means for citrus greening to spread is now done routinely. Before citrus greening disease was introduced, commercial citrus growers did not have to spray pesticides targeting insects. Current research is aimed at pesticide application timing, and pesticide choice for efficacy.

After the introduction of citrus greening disease, all commercial nurseries, where new young trees are purchased, were relocated indoors and a bud wood registration program was enacted. Previously young citrus trees were grown outdoors before disease pressure became an issue. This is to certify that Florida grove owners are able to purchase clean citrus trees for the planting of citrus groves. A greening positive young citrus tree will never reach maturity, even with intensive sprays.

These keystone citriculture practices vector control, soil and foliar nutrition, and certified young trees make up the new best management practices for commercial citrus growers against the citrus greening disease fight. A total management approach appears to provide the best hope of reducing financial impact of this disease. Currently, the best hope for the industry is resistant varieties. The challenge for the commercial producer is to identify low cost strategies that can prolong infected trees until they can be replaced.

== Citrus nutrition ==
=== Citrus malnutrition ===
Nitrogen, potassium and phosphorus are the main macronutrients needed in citrus production, as well as calcium, magnesium and sulfur.

- Nitrogen: Nitrogen is important for overall tree and leaf growth and peel thickness, and fruit acidity.
- Phosphorus: Phosphorus improves root growth, fruit yield and weight and juice while it reduces peel thickness.
- Potassium: Potassium maintains fruit size, acidity, juice and disease tolerance, and it is taken up largely by the citrus fruit; too little K can lead to splitting and plugging of the fruit.

=== Citrus micronutrients ===
Citrus micronutrients include boron, copper, iron and managanese.

- Boron is involved in many enzymatic systems, when it is deficient, the tree suffers in fruit and leaf quality, and the tree loses apical dominance.
- Copper affects photosynthesis and fruit set. Deficiency causes drooping of shoots, "brown gum" eruptions, and death may occur from the tip. If copper based fungicides are used, this is not usually a problem.
- Iron acts as a catalyst for reactions, this element is a cofactor for many enzymes, important for sweetness, increasing total soluble solids and boosting vitamin C and juice content for fruit. Iron deficiency is the most common of the micronutrients, causing symptoms of increased prominence of leaf veins and leaves turning white.
- Manganese deficiency is associated with zinc and iron reductions as well, causing a mottled yellowing of the leaf, almost of a variegated quality. It improves overall sugar production in fruit juice.

== See also ==
- Citrus rootstock
- List of citrus diseases
- Mother Orange Tree
- Luther C. Tibbets
