= Mother Orange Tree =

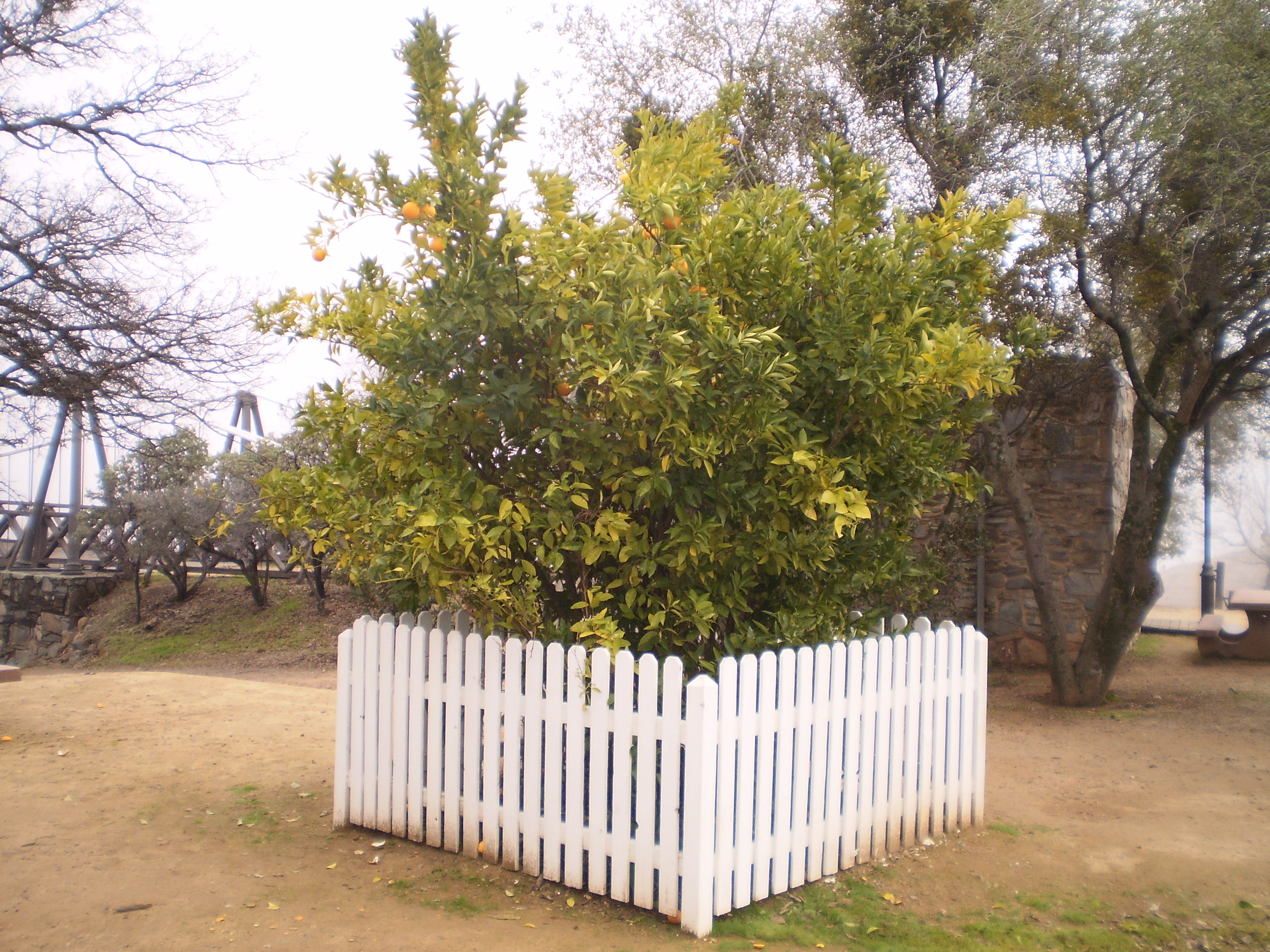
- The Mother Orange Tree
- Interactive map of Mother Orange Tree
- 39°30′40″N 121°30′15.4″W
- Location: 400 Glen Drive, Oroville, California

California Historical Landmark
- Reference no.: 1043

The Mother Orange Tree is the oldest living orange tree in Northern California, United States. Planted in 1854, the California Historical Landmark is located in Oroville.

== History ==
Originally planted in Bidwell's Bar near the Bidwell Bar Bridge, the tree is a Mediterranean sweet orange Citrus × sinensis cultivar. The citrus rootstock was brought from Mazatlán, Mexico, on a shipping vessel. The two-year-old orange tree, which was a novelty in Northern California at the time, was purchased in 1856 by Judge Joseph Lewis in the city of Sacramento and planted at the western approach to the bridge. The planting of the tree was done by Alfred Clarke, with the help of his foreman, Howard Burt.

As the years passed and the tree flourished, growing to a height of over 60 feet (18 m), it was a favorite attraction of miners. They would sample its fruit and save seeds to plant in the dooryards of their cabins. On average, it yielded about 600 pounds (273 kg) of oranges that ripened between February and May each year.

== Transplanting ==
The tree has been transplanted twice: once in 1862 to avoid flooding of the Feather River; and a second time in 1964 during the construction of Oroville Dam when it was moved to the California State Park Headquarters in Oroville. James Edward Huse, a crane operator with Bigge construction was chosen to move the Mother Orange in 1964 due to his ancestors’ involvement in transporting the tree originally. The tree's survival proved that the citrus industry could thrive in the colder climate of Northern California, encouraging many people to grow oranges in the area around Oroville, although the vast majority produced in the region are of the navel orange variety instead.

== Recent events ==
In 1998, a severe frost struck and the tree stopped bearing fruit for a number of years. As a result of the frost, decay fungus entered the trunk and hollowed it out. To ensure preservation of the tree, propagation experts at the University of California, Riverside successfully cloned the tree in 2003 and three clones were brought to Oroville for planting. The tree has since resumed fruit production.

The California Historical Landmark commemorative plaque for the bridge may be found near the tree.

== See also ==
- California Citrus State Historic Park
- Eliza Tibbets - founder of the California citrus industry
- Orcutt Ranch Horticulture Center
- University of California, Riverside Citrus Variety Collection
- Washington navel orange tree (Riverside, California)
